= List of Gaud Saraswat Brahmins =

This is a list of notable Gaud Saraswat Brahmins.

== Politicians ==
- Kashinath Trimbak Telang (1850–1893) - judge, politician, writer and educationalist
- N. G. Chandavarkar (1855–1923) - judge, politician and social reformer
- Manohar Parrikar (1955–2019) -Ex Defence Minister of India, and Chief Minister of Goa for multiple term.
- Suresh Prabhu, Ex Minister of Railways Commerce & Industry and Civil Aviation, former chairman of Saraswat Bank

== Writers and academics ==
- Shenoi Goembab, popularly known as Shenoi Goembab, was a Konkani writer and activist.
- M. Govinda Pai, also known as Rastrakavi Govinda Pai, was a Kannada poet
- R.G. Bhandarkar (1837–1925) - orientalist, and social reformer
- Vijay Tendulkar (1928–2008) - playwright, screenplay writer and journalist
- Dharmananda Damodar Kosambi (1876–1947) - scholar of Buddhism and Pali language
- Damodar Dharmananda Kosambi (1907–1966) - polymath
- Meera Kosambi (1939–2015) - writer and sociologist. Daughter of Damodar Dharmananda Kosambi
- Gopalakrishna Pai, Pai has received the Karnataka Sahitya Academic award, Centre's Kendra Sahitya Academi Award
- Dhairya Dand, Indian American inventor and artist, multiple international awards.

== Film actors and directors ==
- Guru Dutt (1925–1964) - Hindi film actor and director
- Shyam Benegal, Film director
- Anant Nag, Kannada Actor
- Shankar Nag, Kannada Actor and director.
- Girish Karnad, Kannada Actor and director.

== Businessmen ==
- Dayananda Pai, Indian billionaire real estate developer, philanthropist and educationist in Bangalore, India
- T. M. A. Pai, founder of Manipal University and founder of syndicate bank.
- Vittal Mallya, former chairman of United breweries Group.
- Vijay Mallya - Failed businessman son of Vittal Mallya.
- Ammembal Subba Rao Pai -Founder of Canara Bank.

== See also ==
- Gaud Saraswat Brahmin temples in Kerala
