= D. D. Kosambi =

D. D. Kosambi may refer to:

- Dharmananda Damodar Kosambi (1876–1947), Indian scholar on Buddhism
- Damodar Dharmananda Kosambi (1907–1966), Indian mathematician, historian and polymath
