= Issur uprising =

1942 Quit India Movement uprising in Karnataka

The Issur uprising was an anti-British revolt which occurred in the village of Issur (spelt Isur or Eesuru) in the Kingdom of Mysore in 1942 during the Quit India Movement. The villagers responded to Mahatma Gandhi's call to get rid of the British through processions, defiance of the authority of the local officials and formation of alternative administration. They declared their independence and barred the entry of the government officials into the village. The clash between the locals and the officials in the village of Issur on 28 September 1942 led to the deaths of a police officer and a revenue official. The British officials put down the movement and hanged five people for participation in the uprising in 1943.

== Background ==
The Quit India Movement was initiated by the Indian National Congress in August 1942 with the demand that Britain leaves India. The protest also elicited similar protests in the princely state of Mysore. In Issur village, the villagers responded to the movement by forming processions and shouting slogans rejecting taxes and the authority of the government officials.

As per the Shimoga District Gazetteer, daily processions started in the village from 17 August 1942. The slogans that were raised included 'Do not pay taxes' and demanded the destruction of government files and means of communication. The protest gathered momentum in September when village youngsters took the registers of local officials who came to collect land tax and prepare the records of the village.

== Declaration of independence ==
On 26 September 1942, the villagers erected a signboard indicating that Issur is a freedom village, also termed Swatantrahalli. The villagers set up a parallel administration known as a prati-sarkar or a parallel government as described in the accounts of the uprising. The entire revolt was conducted based at the Veerabhadreshwara Temple in the village and this temple acted as the place of discussion for the protestors. The bell in the temple was used as a medium of warning and bringing villagers together.

The parallel administration involved youth in roles similar to those of the government officials. From The Federal, children under the age of 16 years were used to fill certain of these roles partly because of the need to ensure that they did not get arrested by the officials of the government.

== Confrontation with Officials ==
It was on 28 September 1942 that government officials comprising of a policeman and a revenue officer entered Issur. The villagers refused to recognize their authority and insisted that they should follow the rules of the parallel administration. This confrontation led to the death of the two officials.

This resulted in action by the British authorities. Military and police forces were deployed to the area, and the British authorities arrested persons accused of having been involved in the revolt. There have been claims that property was destroyed and villagers beaten up during the operation to round up suspects. Some of the persons involved ran into the nearby forests and hills to escape arrest.

== Trials and execution ==
The villagers were charged for their role in the rebellion and the murder of the two officers. As reported by The Federal newspaper, 41 individuals were charged. Five of the rebels were sentenced to death and were hanged at Bengaluru Jail from 8 to 10 March 1943. The five men were Kammara Gurappa, Jinahalli Mallappa, Suryanarayanachar, Badakalli Halappa, and Gowdra Shankarappa.

There are five other men who have been identified as having been executed in March 1943 and are described by Hindustan Times as young leaders of the rebellion. Women who took part in the struggle have been awarded life imprisonment and include Halamma, Siddamma and Parvathamma.

== Legacy ==
The revolt is a part of the Quit India Movement’s history of the erstwhile Mysore region. There is a memorial in Issur which honors the five persons who were hanged as a result of the rebellion. The village still holds memorials related to the incident in 1942.
