= G. S. Shivarudrappa =

Indian poet (1926–2013)

- Born: 7 February 1926; Issuru, Shikaripura, Kingdom of Mysore, British India
- Died: 23 December 2013 (aged 87); Bangalore, Karnataka, India
- Occupations: Poet; writer; professor; researcher
- Writing career
- Period: 1950–2007
- Genres: Poetry; criticism
- Notable works: Soundraya Sameekshe; Kavyartha Chintana
- Notable awards: Soviet Land Nehru Award (1974); Sahitya Akademi Award (1984); Padma Shri (1998); Pampa Award (1998)
- Movements: Navya, Navodaya and Pragathisheela

Guggari Shanthaveerappa Shivarudrappa (7 February 1926 – 23 December 2013), or colloquially GSS, was an Indian Kannada poet, writer, and researcher who was awarded the title of Rashtrakavi (national poet) by the Government of Karnataka in 2006.

== Early life ==
Shivarudrappa was born on 7 February 1926 in Issur Village, Shikaripura Taluk, in Shivamogga district of Karnataka. He died on 23 December 2013 in Bangalore. His father was a school teacher. He did his primary and secondary schooling in Shikaripura.

== Education ==
Shivarudrappa gained his BA in 1949 and MA in 1953 from University of Mysore, having secured gold medals on three occasions. He was a student and follower of Kuvempu and was heavily inspired by Kuvempu's literary works and life.

In 1965, G.S. Shivarudrappa secured a doctorate for his thesis "Saundarya Samīkṣe" (Kannada : ಸೌಂದರ್ಯ ಸಮೀಕ್ಷೆ), written under the guidance of Kuvempu, a pioneering work in the field of literary aesthetics.

== Professional life ==
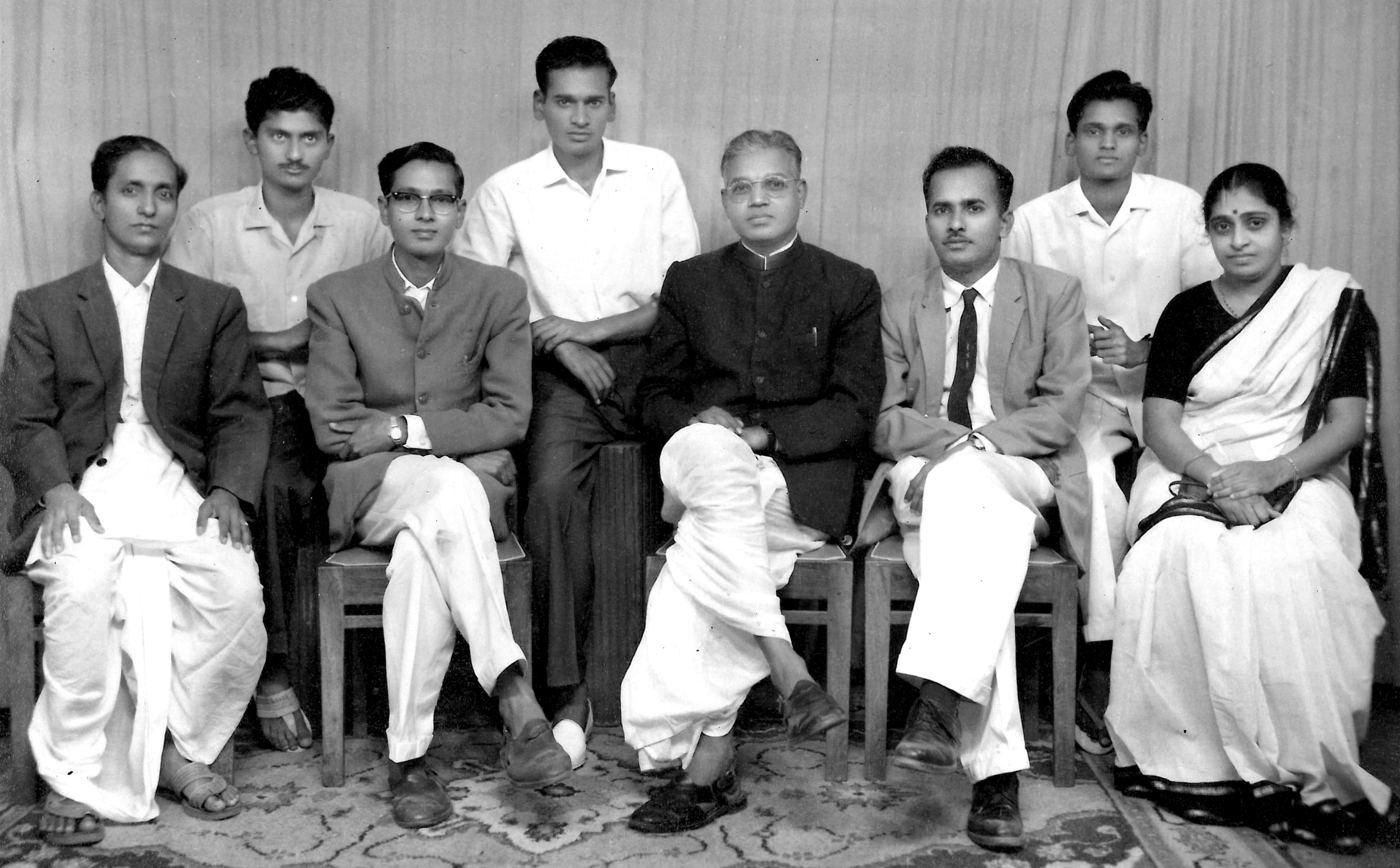
G. S. Shivarudrappa (third from left on the chair) with T. V. Venkatachala Sastry (second from left – on the chair) while at the University of Mysore

Shivarudrappa started his career in 1949 as a lecturer in Kannada language at the Mysore University. In 1963, he joined Hyderabad's Osmania University as a reader, eventually becoming the head of the Kannada department. He remained at Osmania University until 1966.

In 1966, Shivarudrappa joined the Bangalore University as a professor. He was later elected as the director of the university and he continued to contribute to the university's Kannada Study Center (Kannada : ಕನ್ನಡ ಅಧ್ಯಯನ ಕೇಂದ್ರ).

In cities like Davanagere, Shivamogga, and Mysore, he lectured in Kannada. In 1966, he moved his headquarters to Bangalore University, where he served as Director until his retirement from the government in 1986. From 1987 to 1990, he served as the Karnataka Sahitya Academy's president.

== Later life and death ==
Shivarudrappa has worked as a Kannada professor at the Maharaja's College, Mysore and later at the Postgraduate Kannada Department of Bangalore University. He died on 23 December 2013 at his Banashankari, Bangalore residence. The State Government declared a two-day mourning in his honour.

== Rashtrakavi ==
Shivarudrappa was honoured with the title of Rashtrakavi (Sanskrit for "Poet of the Nation") by the Government of Karnataka during the Suvarna Karnataka (Golden Jubilee celebrations of Karnataka) occasion on 1 November, the Kannada Rajyotsava day, 2006. He was the third Kannada poet to be honoured with this title, after Govinda Pai and Kuvempu.

== Literary works ==
=== Collection of poems ===
- Saamagaana
- Cheluvu-Olavu
- Devashilpa
- Deepada Hejje
- Chakragathi
- Anaavarana
- Tereda Daari
- Godhe
- Vyakthamadhya
- Teerthavaani
- Kaarthika
- Kaadina Katthalalli
- Agniparva
- Yede Tumbhi Haadidenu
- Nooraru Kavithegalu
- Samagra Kavya
- Nana hanathe
- Mera Diya Aur Anya Kavitayen

=== Criticism ===
- Parisheelana
- Vimarsheya Poorva Pashchima
- Soundarya Sameekshe (Ph.D. thesis)
- Kaavyaartha Chintana
- Gattibimbha
- Anuranana
- Pratikriye
- Kannada Sahithya Sameekshe
- Mahakavya Swaroopa
- Kannada Kavigala Kaavyakalpane
- Desiyatheyalli Aralida Datta Pratibhe
- Yavudoo Sannadalla
- Pampa : Ondu Adhyayana
- Samagra Kannada Sahitya Charitre – A history of Kannada literature and language and its growth over the centuries
- Kuvempu - Punaravalokana/Kuvempu - a Reappraisal – A biographical work on Kuvempu, done for Government of Karnataka

=== Travelogues ===
- Moscowdalli 22 dina (22 Days in Moscow) – Winner of Soviet Land Nehru Award.
- Englandinalli Chaturmaasa (Four months in England)
- Americadalli Kannadiga (Kannadiga in America)
- Gangeya Shikharagalalli (In the Crest of the River Ganges)

=== Biography ===
G s shivarudrappa

- Shri Kuvempu
- Kavi Bendre
- Fakeer Mohan Senapathi

=== Autobiography ===
- Chaturanga

== Works on G. S. Shivarudrappa ==
- Gourava A Felicitation Volume about the Life and Literature of G. S. Shivarudrappa
- Hanate A Felicitation Volume about the Life and Literature of G. S. Shivarudrappa
- Aakashadeepa A Felicitation Volume about the Life and Literature of G. S. Shivarudrappa
- G. S. Shivarudrappa (Biography) by H. S. Venkateshamurthy
- G. S. S. Sanchaya (An Anthology of Selected Writings)
- Government of Karnataka published his Complete Works in 9 volumes at a subsidized price.

== Awards and honours ==
- Soviet Land Nehru Award in 1974
- Sahitya Akademi Award for his work Kavyartha Chintana in 1984
- Pampa Award in 1996
- Pampa Award – 1998
- Rashtrakavi Award (Poet of the Nation) – 2006
