= D.D. Kosambi: One Life, Many Worlds =

Autobiography of Damodar Dharmananda Kosambi

D. D. Kosambi: One Life, Many Worlds
- Authors: Ram Ramaswamy
- Language: English
- Genre: Biography
- Publisher: HarperCollins India
- Publication date: 15 July 2026
- Publication place: India
- Media type: Print (hardcover)

D. D. Kosambi: One Life, Many Worlds is a 2026 biography of Indian mathematician, historian and polymath Damodar Dharmananda Kosambi, written by physicist and academic Ram Ramaswamy. The book was published by Fourth Estate, an imprint of HarperCollins India, in July 2026.

== Reception ==
Ananya Vajpeyi of The Hindu wrote in a review “For all his brilliance, the mind-boggling range of DDK's interests and the ever more pronounced eccentricities of his personality did not endear him to his peers. But in the end, we get a clue to the lasting light of D.D. Kosambi: “A man is not dead when those he loved remember him.”

Nikhil Sanjay Rekha Adsule of Outlook India wrote in a review ”Today, history is routinely weaponised for immediate political gain and for ideological conformity. Kosambi's scholarship and his legacy serve as an anchor in our time. One Life, Many Worlds reminds us what it truly means to live a life of the mind—fearless, endlessly inquisitive and profoundly accountable to the world it seeks to explain.”
