= Śatakatraya =

Indian collections of Sanskrit poetry

Manuscript of Shatakatraya in Newar script

The Śatakatraya (Sanskrit: शतकत्रय, lit. 'The Three Satakas'), (also known as subhāṣita triśati, Sanskrit: सुभाषित त्रिशति:, lit. 'The Three Hundred Poems of Moral Values') refers to three Indian collections of Sanskrit poetry, containing a hundred verses each. The three śataka's are known as the Nītiśataka, Śṛṅgāraśataka, and Vairāgyaśataka, and are attributed to Bhartṛhari c. 5th century CE.

== The three Śatakas ==
Indian scholar K. M. Joglekar in his translation work 'Bhartrihari: Niti and Vairagya Shatakas' says that, "The Shatakas were composed when Bhartrihari had renounced the world. It is not easy to say in what order they were written, from the subject matter of each of them, it is likely that Shringarashatak was written first, then followed the Niti and lastly the Vairagyashataka".

The Nītiśataka deals with nīti, roughly meaning ethics and morality. Śṛṅgāraśataka deals with love and women. Vairāgyaśataka contains verses on renunciation. The Sanskrit scholar Barbara Stoler Miller translated these sections as Among Fools and Kings, Passionate Encounters and Refuge in the Forest respectively.

Especially in the Vairāgyaśataka, but also in the other two, his poetry displays the depth and intensity of his renunciation as he vacillates between the pursuits of fleshly desires and those of the spirit. Thus it reveals the conflict experienced "between a profound attraction to sensual beauty and the yearning for liberation from it", showing how "most great Indian art could be at once so sensuous and so spiritual".

There is great variation between versions of his Śatakas, and together the available manuscripts have over 700 verses instead of 300. D. D. Kosambi identified about 200 verses that appear in all manuscripts. Despite the variation in content, there is remarkable similarity in theme; Kosambi believes that each śataka came to attract a certain type of stanza similar to the ones present in the original collection. Moreover, at least among the 200 "common" stanzas, there is a distinctive voice of irony, scepticism and discontent, making the attribution to a single author plausible.

According to one legend associated with him (possibly in confusion with the legend of king Bharthari), he was a king, who once gave a magic fruit to his wife, who gave it to another man, who in turn gave it to another woman, and finally it reached the king again. Reflecting on these events, he realised the futility of love and worldly pleasures, renounced his kingdom, retired to the forest, and wrote poetry. This is connected with a famous verse that appears in the collections:

Devanāgari :

यां चिन्तयामि सततं मयि सा विरक्ता
साप्यन्यम् इच्छति जनं स जनो ऽन्यसक्तः ।
अस्मत्कृते च परिशुष्यति काचिद् अन्या
धिक् तां च तं च मदनं च इमां च मां च ॥

IAST :
yāṃ cintayāmi satataṃ mayi sā viraktā
sāpyanyam icchati janaṃ sa jano 'nyasaktaḥ ।
asmatkṛte ca pariśuṣyati kācid anyā
dhik tāṃ ca taṃ ca madanaṃ ca imāṃ ca māṃ ca ।।

The maid my true heart loves would not my true love be;
She seeks another man; another maid loves he;
And me another maid her own true love would see:
Oh, fie on her and him and Love and HER and me!

— Translation by Ryder

However, the verse is probably a later addition, and many of the other verses suggest that the poet was not a king but a courtier serving a king — thus there are many verses rebuking the foolish pride of kings, and bemoaning the indignity of servitude.

=== Nītiśataka ===
The Sanskrit scholar and commentator Budhendra has classified the Nītiśhataka into the following sections, each called a paddhati:

- mūrkha-paddhati – On Fools and Folly
- vidvat-paddhati – On Wisdom
- māna-śaurya-paddhati – On Pride and Heroism
- artha-paddhati – On Wealth
- durjana-paddhati – On Wicked People
- sujana-paddhati – On Wise Men
- paropakāra-paddhati – On Virtue
- dhairya-paddhati - On Firmness, Valor
- daiva-paddhati – On Fate
- karma-paddhati – On Work

Some verses from Nītiśataka

संगीतसाहित्यकलाविहीनः
साक्षात् पशुःपुच्छविषाणहीनः |
तृणं नखादन्नपिजीवमानः
तद्भागधेयंपरमंपशूनाम् ||

saṅgīta-sāhitya-kalā-vihīnaḥ
sākṣāt paśuḥ puccha-viṣāṇa-hīnaḥ |
tṛṇaṃ na khādann api jīvamānaḥ
tad bhāgadhēyaṃ paramaṃ paśūnām ||

This verse means that a human devoid of poetry, music and arts is equivalent to an animal which does not have horns and tails. It is the great good luck of other beasts that they don't graze grass, and still survive.

== Editions of the Śatakatraya ==
=== Without translation ===
- Kashinath Trimbak Telang (1874), The Nîtiśataka and Vairâgyaśataka of Bhartṛhari: with extracts from two Sanskṛit commentaries, Bombay Sanskrit series, No. 11. Includes detailed notes in English.
- Kr̥ṣṇa Śāstrī Mahabala (1888), Satakatrayam, Nirnaya Sagara Press. With Sanskrit commentary by the author.
- Bhartr̥hari; Kavalesara Sinha (1888), Çataka-traya, Victoria Press. With Sanskrit commentary by the author.
- D. D. Kosambi, 1945 The Satakatrayam of Bhartrhari with the Comm. of Ramarsi, edited in collaboration with Pt. K. V. Krishnamoorthi Sharma (Anandasrama Sanskrit Series, No.127, Poona)
- D. D. Kosambi, 1946 The Southern Archetype of Epigrams Ascribed to Bhartrhari (Bharatiya Vidya Series 9, Bombay) (First critical edition of a Bhartrhari recension.)
- D. D. Kosambi, 1948 The Epigrams Attributed to Bhartrhari (Singhi Jain Series 23, Bombay) (Comprehensive edition of the poet's work remarkable for rigorous standards of text criticism.) Review by Emeneau. Digitized by the Digital Library of India
- D. D. Kosambi, 1959 Bhartrihari's Satakatrayam With the Oldest Commentary of Jain Scholar Dhanasāragaṇi With Principal Variants from Many Manuscripts etc. (Bombay, Bharatiya Vidya Bhavan). Digitized by the Digital Library of India

=== Sanskrit with translation ===
- Peter von Bohlen (1833), Bhartriharis sententiae et carmen quod Chauri nomine circumfertur eroticum, Berlin. Sanskrit text with introduction, translation and notes in Latin. All three śatakas, also includes Bilhana's Chaura-panchashika.
- Purohita Gopīnātha (1896), The Nîtiśataka Śringâraśataka and Vairâgyaśataka, Bombay. Hindi and English translation.
- Moreshvar Ramchandra Kāle; M. B. Gurjar (1898), The Nîtiśataka and Vairâgyaśataka Translation and notes.
- K. M. Joglekar; Bhaskar Rajaram Joshi (1900), Niti and Vairagya Shatakas with notes, translation, a critical introduction
- Moreshvar Ramchandra Kāle (1902), The Nîtiśataka and Vairâgyaśataka. Reprinted as Nīti and Vairāgya Śatakas of Bhartṛhari, Motilal Banarsidass, ISBN 81-208-0642-5. Brief commentary in Sanskrit, translation and notes in English.
- Barbara Stoler Miller (1967), Bhartrihari: Poems, Columbia University Press (UNESCO collection of representative works), ISBN 978-0-231-02999-5. Sanskrit text with facing free-verse translation.
- Greg Bailey and Richard F. Gombrich, 2005, Love Lyrics by Amaru [and] Bhartṛhari, translated by Greg Bailey & by Bilhaṇa edited and translated by Richard Gombrich (New York: NYU). See: Open Library ISBN 0-8147-9938-8. Sanskrit text with facing free-verse translation.

=== Translation ===
(without Sanskrit text)

- Peter von Bohlen (1835), Die Sprüche des Bhartriharis, August Campe . German verse translation of all three śatakas, based on Bohlen's edition.
- Paul Regnaud (1875), Les stances érotiques, morales et religieuses de Bhartrihari, E. Leroux, Les classiques de l'Inde ancienne. French prose translation of all three śatakas.
- Charles Henry Tawney (1877), Two centuries of Bhartrihari, Thacker, Spink and Co. ,. Rhyming translation of the Nīti and Vairāgya Śatakas.
- J M Kennedy, The Satakas; or, Wise sayings of Bhartrihari. London, 1913. Prose translation of all three śatakas.
- Biscoe Hale Wortham (1886), The Śatakas of Bhartr̥ihari, Trübner . London: Trübner, 1886, reprint Routledge 2000, ISBN 0-415-24510-9. Prose translation of the Nīti and Vairāgya Śatakas.
- Paul Elmer More (1898), A century of Indian epigrams: chiefly from the Sanskrit of Bhartrihari, Houghton Mifflin . Rhyming translation of 100 verses, mostly from Bhartṛhari.
- Arthur William Ryder (1910), Women's Eyes, A.M. Robertson. Rhyming translation of 85 verses from Bhartṛhari, plus 15 from other sources.
- The Vairagya-Satakam Or The Hundred Verses On Renunciation. Advaita Ashrama. 1916.
- Sri Aurobindo (1924), The Century of Life. Republished 1998 by the Sri Aurobindo Society, ISBN 978-81-7060-120-3. Available online in Volume 5 (Translations) of his complete works. Verse translation of the Nīti Śataka.
- A N D Haksar (2017), Three Hundred Verses: Musings on Life, Love and Renunciation, Penguin ISBN 978-0670090068
