= Genetic map function =

In genetics, mapping functions are used to model the relationship between map distances (measured in map units or centimorgans) and recombination frequencies, particularly as these measurements relate to regions encompassed between genetic markers. One utility of this approach is that it allows one to obtain values for distances in genetic mapping units directly from recombination fractions, as map distances cannot typically be obtained from empirical experiments.

The simplest mapping function is the Morgan Mapping Function, eponymously devised by Thomas Hunt Morgan. Other well-known mapping functions include the Haldane Mapping Function introduced by J. B. S. Haldane in 1919, and the Kosambi Mapping Function introduced by Damodar Dharmananda Kosambi in 1944. Few mapping functions are used in practice other than Haldane and Kosambi. The main difference between them is in how crossover interference is incorporated.

== Morgan Mapping Function ==
Where d is the distance in map units, the Morgan Mapping Function states that the recombination frequency r can be expressed as $\ r=d$ . This assumes that one crossover occurs, at most, in an interval between two loci, and that the probability of the occurrence of this crossover is proportional to the map length of the interval.

Where d is the distance in map units, the recombination frequency r can be expressed as:

$\ r = \frac{1}{2} [1-(1-2d)] = d$

The equation only holds when $\frac{1}{2} \geq d \geq 0$ as, otherwise, recombination frequency would exceed 50%. Therefore, the function cannot approximate recombination frequencies beyond short distances.

== Haldane Mapping Function ==
=== Overview ===
Two properties of the Haldane Mapping Function is that it limits recombination frequency up to, but not beyond 50%, and that it represents a linear relationship between the frequency of recombination and map distance up to recombination frequencies of 10%. It also assumes that crossovers occur at random positions and that they do so independent of one another. This assumption therefore also assumes no crossover interference takes place; but using this assumption allows Haldane to model the mapping function using a Poisson distribution.

=== Definitions ===
- r = recombination frequency
- d = mean number of crossovers on a chromosomal interval
- 2d = mean number of crossovers for a tetrad
- e^{-2d} = probability of no genetic exchange in a chromosomal interval

=== Formula ===
$\ r = \frac{1}{2} (1-e^{-2d})$

=== Inverse ===
$\ d = -\frac{1}{2} \ln (1-2r)$

== Kosambi Mapping Function ==
=== Overview ===
The Kosambi mapping function was introduced to account for the impact played by crossover interference on recombination frequency. It introduces a parameter C, representing the coefficient of coincidence, and sets it equal to 2r. For loci which are strongly linked, interference is strong; otherwise, interference decreases towards zero. Interference declines according to the linear function i = 1 - 2r.

=== Formula ===
$\ r = \frac{1}{2}\tanh(2d) = \frac{1}{2}\frac{e^{4d}-1}{e^{4d}+1}$

=== Inverse ===
$\ d = \frac{1}{2} \tanh^{-1} (2r) = \frac{1}{4}\ln(\frac{1+2r}{1-2r})$

== Comparison and application ==
Below 10% recombination frequency, there is little mathematical difference between different mapping functions and the relationship between map distance and recombination frequency is linear (that is, 1 map unit = 1% recombination frequency). When genome-wide SNP sampling and mapping data is present, the difference between the functions is negligible outside of regions of high recombination, such as recombination hotspots or ends of chromosomes.

While many mapping functions now exist, in practice functions other than Haldane and Kosambi are rarely used. More specifically, the Haldane function is preferred when distance between markers is relatively small, whereas the Kosambi function is preferred when distances between markers is larger and crossovers need to be accounted for.
