= An Introduction to the Study of Indian History =

1956 book by Damodar Dharmananda Kosambi

- Cover of 2012 paperback edition
- Author: Damodar Dharmanand Kosambi
- Language: English
- Genre: History
- Published: 1956 (Popular Prakashan)
- Publication place: India
- Media type: Print (Hardcover, Paperback)
- Pages: 416 (2012 reprint)
- ISBN: 978-8171540389 (paperback)

An Introduction to the Study of Indian History is a classic work of Indian historiography by Damodar Dharmananda Kosambi first published in 1956.

Through this book Kosambi revolutionised Indian historiography with his realistic and scientific approach. He understood history in terms of the dynamics of socio-economic formations rather than just a chronological narration of "episodes" or the feats of a few great men – kings, warriors or saints. In the very first paragraph of his classic work, An Introduction to the Study of Indian History, he gives an insight into his methodology as a prelude to his life work on ancient Indian history:

"The light-hearted sneer 'India has had some episodes, but no history' is used to justify lack of study, grasp, intelligence on the part of foreign writers about India's past. The considerations that follow will prove that it is precisely the episodes — lists of dynasties and kings, tales of war and battle spiced with anecdote, which fill school texts — that are missing from Indian records. Here, for the first time, we have to reconstruct a history without episodes, which means that it cannot be the same type of history as in the European tradition."

== Contents ==
If people cannot distinguish physical from man-made necessity, if they do not consciously search out the hidden laws of matter, they remain helpless in the face of nature. Therefore, later Brahminism greatly restricted both human freedom – the recognition of necessity – and the production of value, which is measured by SOCIALLY NECESSARY labour-time. Science as the cognition of necessity was incompatible with brahmin insistence upon dogma and authority. The incompatibility grew with the practice of forging or rewriting sacred works to order.”

— From An Introduction to the Study of Indian History (p.249, 2012)
- Scope and Methods
1. Special methods needed for Indian history
2. Available materials
3. The underlying philosophy
- The Heritage of Pre-class Society
1. Prehistoric archaeology
2. Tribal society
3. Tribal survivals
4. The Vetala cult
5. Higher local cults
6. Festival and rites
- Civilization and Barbarism in the Indus Valley
1. The Indus cities
2. Indus trade and religion
3. Maintenance of class structure
4. Food production
- The Aryans in the Land of the Seven Rivers
1. Aryans outside India
2. Rigvedic information
3. Panis and new tribes
4. Origins of caste
5. Brahmin clans
- The Aryan Expansion
1. Aryan as a mode of living
2. Study of legend and myth
3. Yajurvedic settlements
4. The eastward drive
5. Tribes and dynasties
6. The mark of primitive tribes
7. The new brahminism
8. Beyond brahminism; ritual, food production and trade
9. The need for radical change
- The Rise of Magadha
1. New institutions and sources
2. Tribes and kingdoms
3. Kosala and Magadha
4. Destruction of tribal power
5. New religions
6. Buddhism
7. Appendix: Punch-marked coins
- The Formation of a Village Economy
1. The first empire
2. Alexander and the Greek accounts of India
3. The Asokan transformation of society
4. Authenticity of the Arthashastra
5. The pre-Asokan state and administration
6. The class structure
7. Productive basis of the state
- Interlude of Trade and Invasions
1. After the Mauryans
2. Superstition in agrarian society
3. Caste and the village; the Manusmriti
4. Changes in religion
5. The settlement of the Deccan plateau
6. Commodity producers and trade
7. The development of Sanskrit
8. Social functions of Sanskrit literature
- Feudalism from Above
1. Early feudal developments
2. Growth of villages and barbarism
3. The India of the Guptas and Harsa
4. Religion and the development of village settlement
5. The concept of property in Land
6. Maryurasarman's settlement in the west coast
7. Village craftsmen and artisans
- Feudalism from Below
1. Difference between Indian and English feudalism
2. The role of trade in feudal society
3. The Muslims
4. Change to feudalism from below; slavery
5. Feudal prince, landlord and peasant
6. Degeneracy and collapse
7. The bourgeois conquest

== Reception ==
According to A. L. Basham, "An Introduction to the Study of Indian History is in many respects an epoch making work, containing brilliantly original ideas on almost every page; if it contains errors and misrepresentations, if now and then its author attempts to force his data into a rather doctrinaire pattern, this does not appreciably lessen the significance of this very exciting book, which has stimulated the thought of thousands of students throughout the world."
