= Radiation reduced hybrid =

Procedure to find relative location of genetic markers

Radiation reduced hybrid is procedure in discovering the location of genetic markers relative to one another. The relative location of these markers can be combined into a physical map or a genetic map. The radiation hybrid technique begins as another way to amplify and purify DNA, the first step in any sequencing project; radiation is used to break the DNA into pieces and these pieces are incorporated into the hybrid cell; the hybrid can be grown in large quantities. One can then check for the presence of various genetic markers using PCR and linkage analysis to resolve the distance between the markers. That is, if two genetic markers are near each other, they are less likely to be separated by the DNA-breaking radiation. The technique is similar to traditional linkage analysis, where we depend on genetic recombination to calculate the distance between two genetic markers.

== Procedure ==
The procedure utilizes two cell lines, neither of which can survive in toxic media, but contain genes that can resist the toxin when contained by the same cell. The cell line under study is irradiated, causing breaks in the DNA. These cells are fused with the other cell line, producing a hybrid. If the hybrid incorporates genes from both cells, it will be able to survive in the toxic media.

The cells that survive can be grown in large quantities, thus amplifying the DNA that was incorporated from the irradiated cell line. One can prepare a sample of DNA from the hybrid cell line and use PCR to amplify two specific genetic markers. By running the PCR products on a gel, one can determine if both markers are in the cell line. If both markers are usually in the hybrid, we can conclude that they are near each other.
