= Meera Kosambi =

Indian sociologist (1939–2015)

- Born: 24 April 1939
- Died: 26 February 2015 (aged 75); Pune, Maharashtra, India
- Occupation: Sociologist
- Father: Damodar Dharmanand Kosambi
- Relatives: Dharmanand Kosambi (grandfather)

Meera Kosambi (24 April 1939 – 26 February 2015) was an Indian sociologist.

== Biography ==
She was the younger daughter of the historian and mathematician, D.D. Kosambi, and granddaughter of Dharmananda Damodar Kosambi, a Buddhist scholar and a Pāli language expert; her mother's name was Nalini Kosambi (née Madgavkar). She received a Ph.D. in sociology from the Stockholm University. She is the author of several books and articles on urban sociology and women's studies in India.

For nearly a decade Kosambi served as Director of the Research Centre for Women's Studies at the SNDT University for Women, Mumbai. She worked extensively on the 19th-century Indian feminist Pandita Ramabai, whose writings she compiled, edited and translated from Marathi. She has also translated and edited the autobiography and scholarly writings of her grandfather Dharmananda Damodar Kosambi.

Kosambi died in Pune on 26 February 2015 after a brief illness.

== Works ==
- 1986 Bombay in Transition: The Growth and Social Ecology of a Colonial City, 1880-1980, Stockholm, Sweden: Almqvist & Wiksell International
- 1994 Women's Oppression in the Public Gaze: an Analysis of Newspaper Coverage, State Action and Activist Response (edited), Bombay: Research Centre for Women's Studies, S.N.D.T. Women's University
- 1994 Urbanization and Urban Development in India, New Delhi: Indian Council of Social Science Research
- 1995 Pandita Ramabai’s Feminist and Christian Conversions: Focus on Stree Dharma-neeti, Bombay: Research Centre for Women's Studies, S.N.D.T. Women's University
- 1996 Women in Decision-Making in the Private Sector in India (with Divya Pandey and Veena Poonacha), Mumbai: Research Centre for Women's Studies, S.N.D.T. Women's University
- 2000 Intersections: Socio-Cultural Trends in Maharashtra (edited), New Delhi: Orient Longman, New Delhi
- 2000 Pandita Ramabai Through Her Own Words: Selected Works (translated, edited and compiled) New Delhi; New York: Oxford University Press
- 2003 Pandita Ramabai's American Encounter: The Peoples of the United States (1889) (translated and edited), Bloomington: Indiana University Press.
- 2007 Crossing Thresholds: Feminist Essays in Social History, Ranikhet: Permanent Black
- 2011 Nivedan: The Autobiography of Dharmanand Kosambi, trans. by Meera Kosambi. Ranikhet: Permanent Black.
- 2012 Women Writing Gender (edited, translated and with an introduction), Ranikhet: Permanent Black, ISBN 978-8178243368
- 2013 Dharmanand Kosambi: The Essential Writings, ed. by Meera Kosambi. Orient Blackswan.
