= M. Govinda Pai =

Kannada poet (1883–1963)

Manjeshwar Govinda Pai
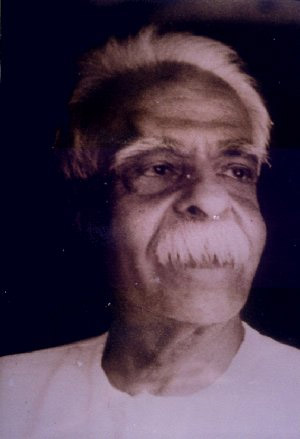
- Born: 23 March 1883; Manjeshwar, South Canara district, Madras Presidency, British India (now Kasaragod District, Kerala, India)
- Died: 6 September 1963 (aged 80)
- Occupation: Writer
- Spouse: Krishna Bai

Manjeshwar Govinda Pai (23 March 1883 – 6 September 1963), also known as Rastrakavi Govinda Pai, was an Indian Kannada-language poet. He was awarded the first Rashtrakavi title by the Madras Government (Kasaragod district was part of South Kanara district of Madras Presidency prior to the linguistic reorganisation of States on 1 November 1956). Rashtrakavi M. Govinda Pai was the one who put Manjeshwara(Karnataka) on the literary map of India.

== Early life ==
Govinda Pai was born on 23 March 1883 in a Konkani Goud Saraswat Brahmin family at his maternal grandfather's house in Manjeshwar. He was the first son of Mangalore Sahukaar Thimmappa Pai and Devaki Amma. Govinda Pai went to Mission School and then went to Canara High School in Mangalore. For college education, Pai went to Madras (Chennai). Due to the sudden death of his father, he had to return.

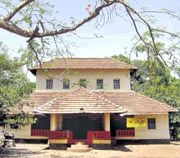
Nearly sixty years of his life were spent in this house in Manjeshwar

== Career ==
Govinda Pai was also a prolific prose writer. His earliest composition in prose was Srikrishna Charita (1909) which makes for remarkable reading. Govinda Pai narrated the story of Christ's crucifixion in his work Golgotha (1931). The next three panegyrics published by him; Vaishakhi, Prabhasa and Dehali, narrated the last days of the Buddha, God Krishna and Gandhi respectively; were a result of the huge success of Golgotha. His best works written in blank verse, viz., Golgotha (The last days of Christ, published in 1937), Vaisakhi (The last days of Buddha, published in 1946) and Hebberalu (The Thumb, the story of Ekalavya retold, published in 1946) have won a lasting place in the gallery of the greatest poets of Kannada literature. Gommata Jinastuti was his first published work. He introduced the sonnet form into Kannada. Hebberalu dramatises the story of Drona and Ekalavya, characters from the epic Mahabharata.

Govinda Pai also enriched Kannada learning with his historical studies and research. He was an authority on the chronology and history of Tulunad. His works also testify to his universal outlook as well as to his deep compassion for the poor and the downtrodden.

He was able to read and write fluently in 25 languages including Tulu, Malayalam, Sanskrit, Telugu, Tamil, Marathi, Bengali, Persian, Pali, Urdu, Greek and Japanese apart from Kannada, Konkani and English. He translated several Japanese works into Kannada.

== Works ==
His poems collections are:

- Gilivindu (1930) (parrot flocks)

His first collection ಗಿಳಿವಿಂಡು consists of 46 poems exhibits poets perspective towards life, his love for the country, his responsiveness to the nature around him and his love for Kannada.

- Nandadeepa (The enduring lamp)

His Nandadeepa consisting of 37 poems, a tribute of devotion to God. Sri Pai's name will be remembered for ever in the realm of Kannada language as well as in the minds of Kannada people.

- Hrudayaranga

His other works include

- Hebberalu (On Ekalavya)
- Chitrabhanu (On Quit India movement)
- Vaishaki (About the last days of the Buddha)
- Mannina Sogadu
- Taayi

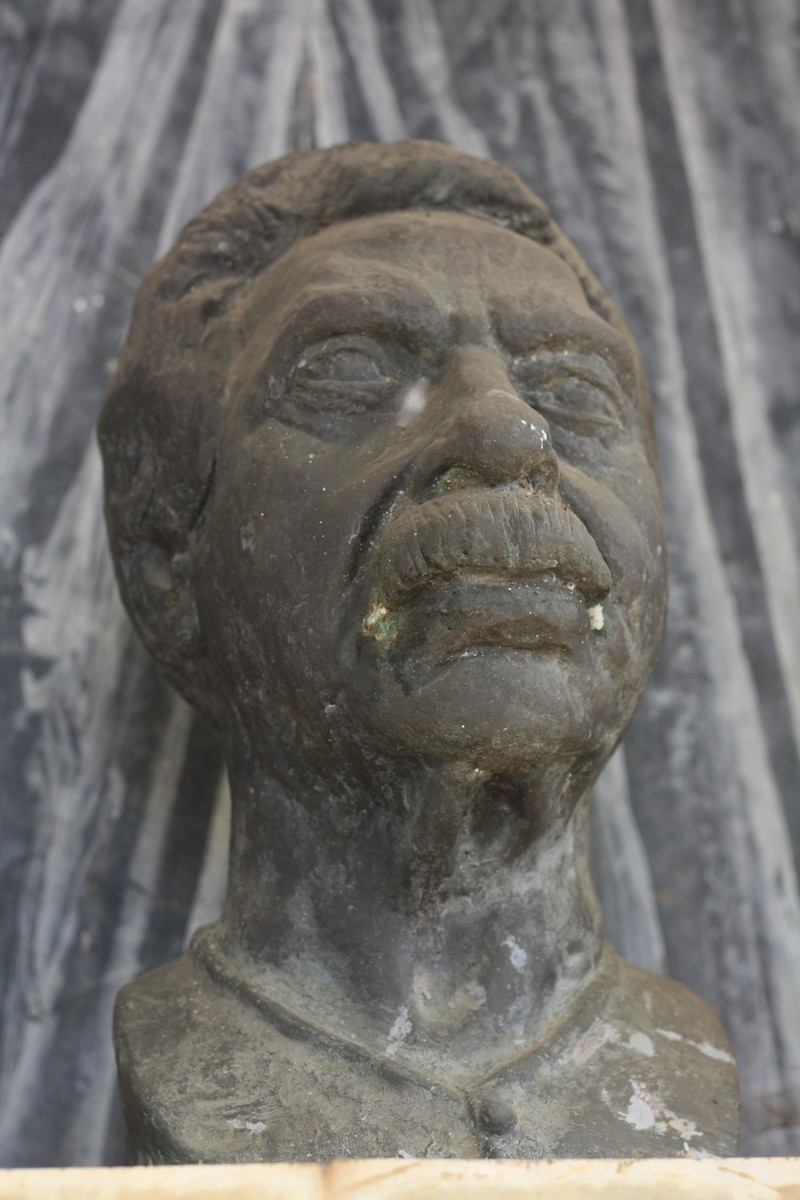
Bust of Pai at M. Govinda Pai Regional Research Centre, Udupi

== About his rewards and legacy ==
In 1949, the then Madras Government conferred on him the Rashtrakavi award. He was the president of Kannada Sahitya Sammelana at Bombay in 1951.

On his 125th birth anniversary, a national award was instituted in his name and his old house at Manjeshwar is mooted to be a national monument.

In Udupi near his native place, the Govind Pai Research Institute is established near MGM College of Dr. T.M.A Pai Foundation of Manipal institutions. Other centres in the vicinity are Yakshagana & Janapada Samshodhana Kendra, Kanakadasa Peetha and Tulu lexicon project.

Govind Pai was also acknowledged by the government of Kerala. The Govind Pai Memorial College is a part of Kannur University in Manjeswar is a testimonial for this.

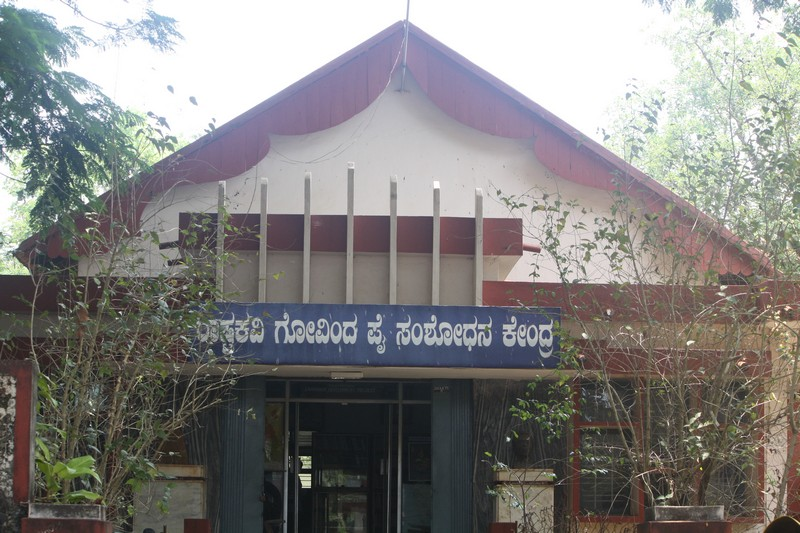
M Govinda Pai Regional Research Centre Udupi

Govind Pai attended the Intermediate Course at Government College, Mangalore. It was here that he had Panje Mangesh Rao as one of his teachers. Panje was another pioneer of the Modern Kannada literary renaissance. Govind Pai had once asked Panje for the text of two songs which Panje used to recite. Panje used to borrow literary journals from Govind Pai, who, even as a lad of 13, had developed a taste for books and had started subscribing to literary journals.

On the occasion of Govind Pai's 125th birthday celebration at Manjeshwar, the foundation stone for the 'Gilivindu Project' was laid. The Union government and state governments of Kerala and Karnataka jointly took the initiative to build a memorial by planning a project called 'Gilivindu' at an estimated cost of Rs 20 million, which will consist of an open amphitheater, venue for staging plays, art exhibitions, Yakshagana, library section, preservation of manuscripts, research, comparative studies, archives, guest house for scholars etc.

The Indian Oil Corporation (IOC) foundation would meet the expenses to renovate the Govinda Pai memorial building into a museum, library and an auditorium. The initiative was part of the ‘Gulivindu’ project, launched by the Kerala and Karnataka governments, to develop the poet's ancestral house here into a national level centre of literature, culture, and research.

Govind Pai is known through his poems, plays, essays, and other literary and non-literary works. His life and accomplishments were recorded by various writers. Pai had a large circle of friends and readers; in a 1965 commemoration volume published in Kundapur, 70 writers contributed sketches of his qualities and character. Aspects of his background reflected in his works are further addressed in these reminiscences.

Poetic composition in Kannada was largely conventional around the turn of the century. On the prescription of all poets invariably used to maintain the initial rhyme in versification. Govind Pai too adhered to this practice in the early stages of his career. His first poem "Suvasini" was published in the journal of the same name The first poems to be published in "Swadeshabhimani" were "Subhadra Vilapa" and "Kaliya Mardana". These poems had the initial rhyme. These rhymed poems were published in the journal Swadeshabhimani from 1903 to 1910.

But slowly Govind Pai began to ask whether initial rhyme was so essential to poetry. Sanskrit poetry and English poetry did not have this element but that did not detract from their merit. Once Govind Pai made bold to ask Panje Mangesh Rao about his opinion on giving up rhyme. He seemed to imply that writing without rhyme meant a lack of poetic skill. Govind Pai was not satisfied with the response. But he still hesitated to deviate from the trodden path. Some poems which he wrote without rhyme he destroyed. But when he was in Baroda in 1911 he finally made up his mind to renounce rhyme. But today Govind Pai's route of deviation has become the royal path.

== Artefacts available at M Govinda Pai Regional Research Centre Udupi ==
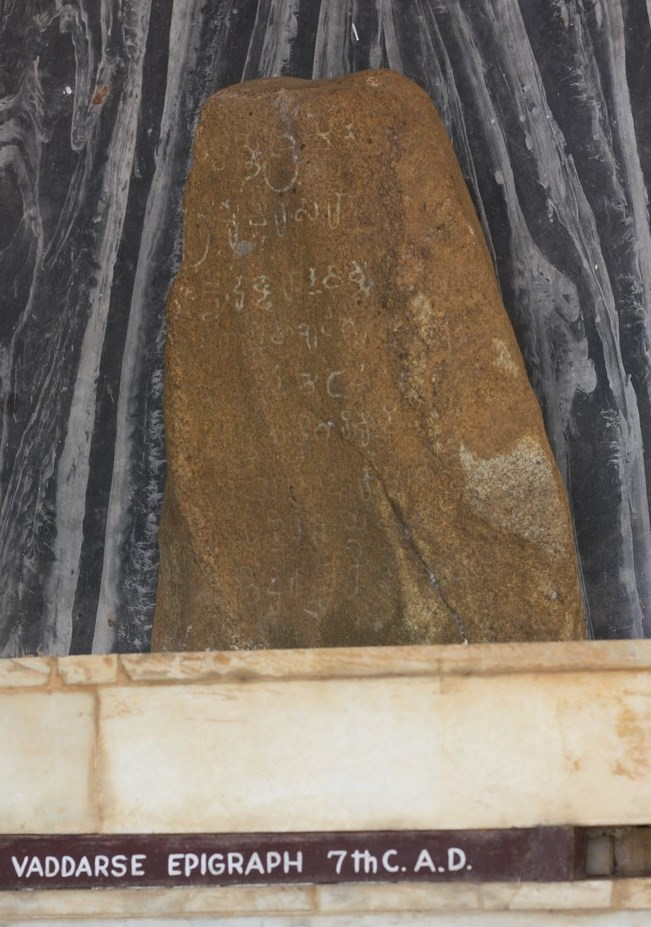

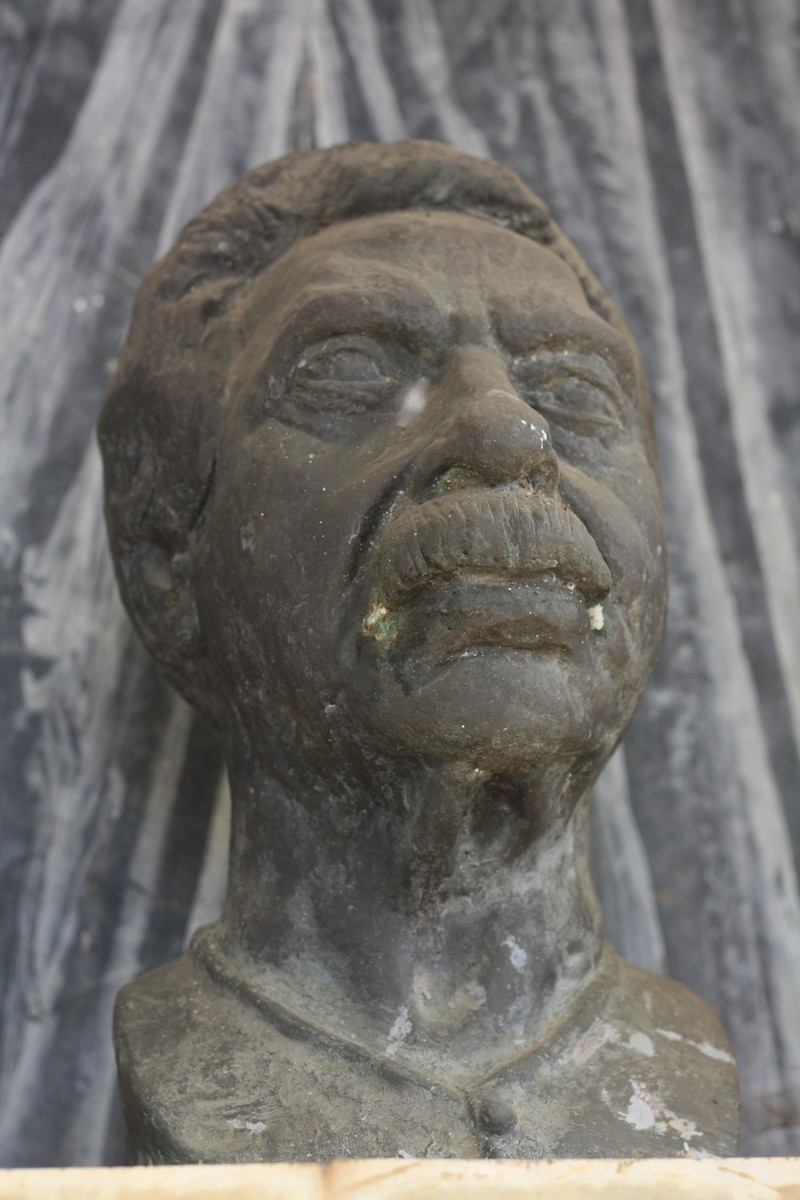

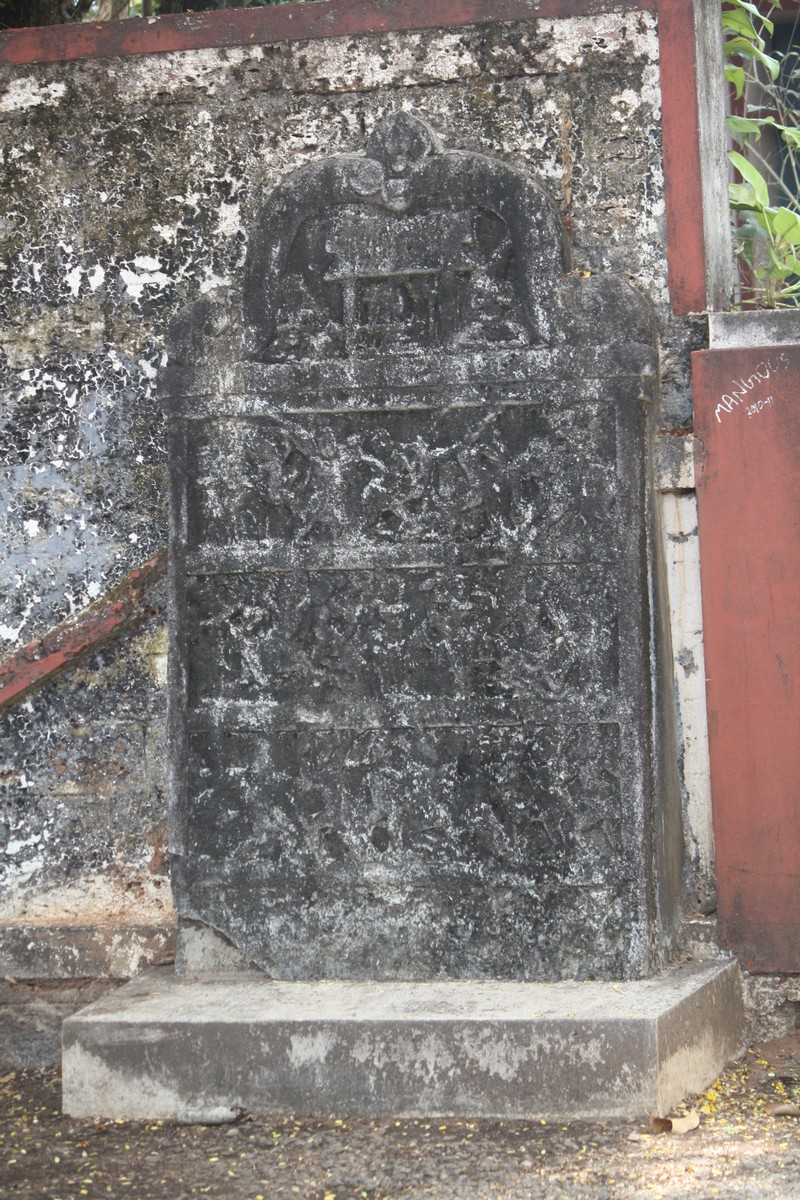

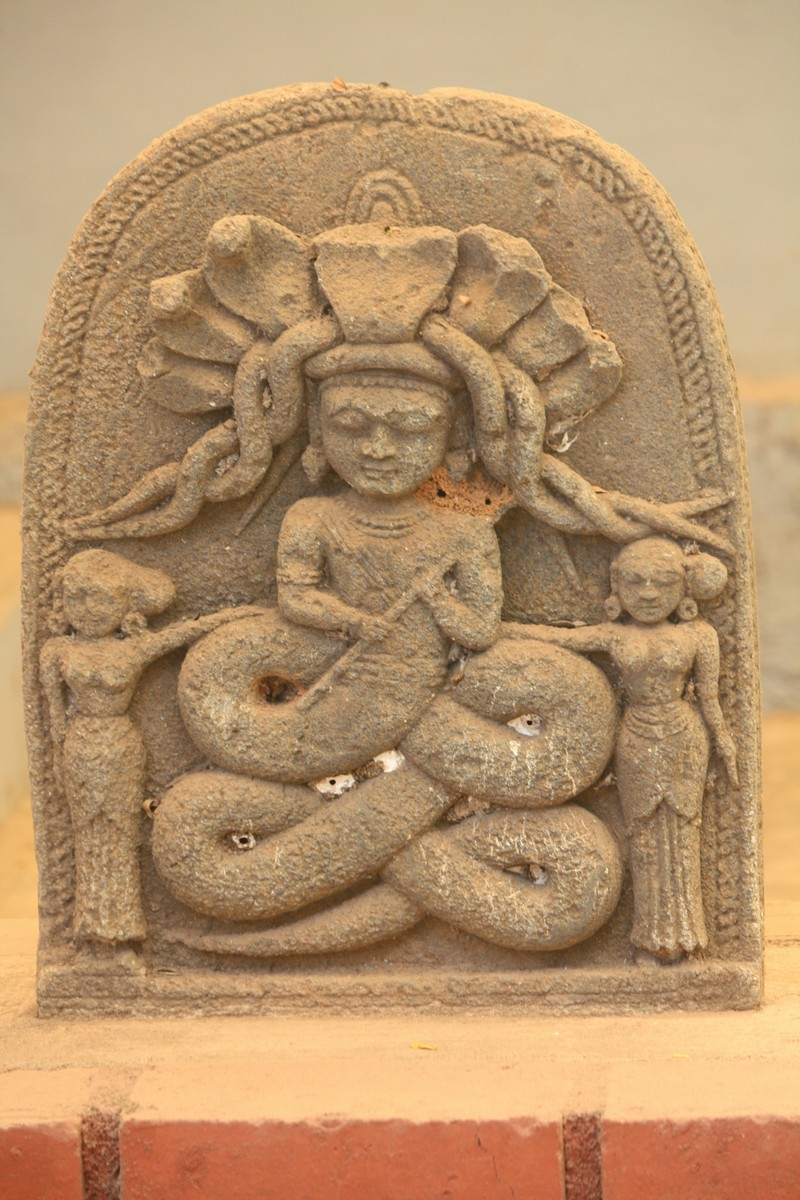

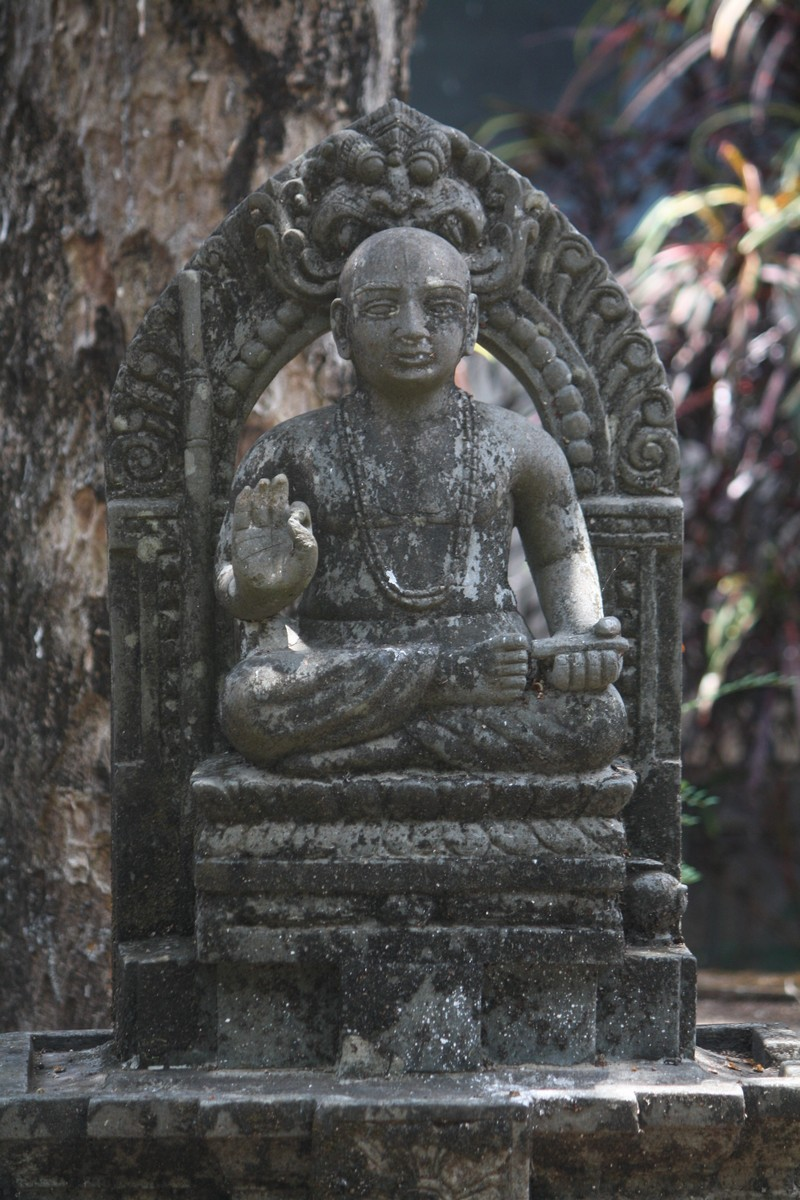

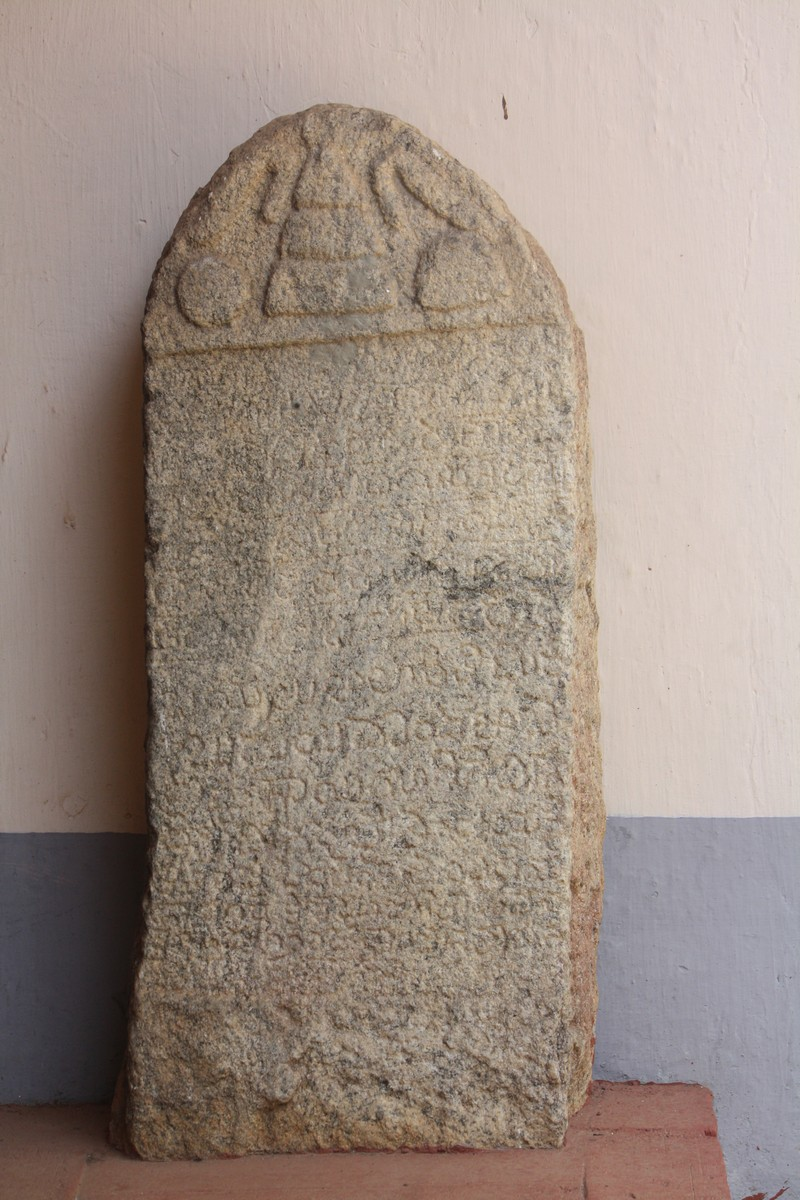

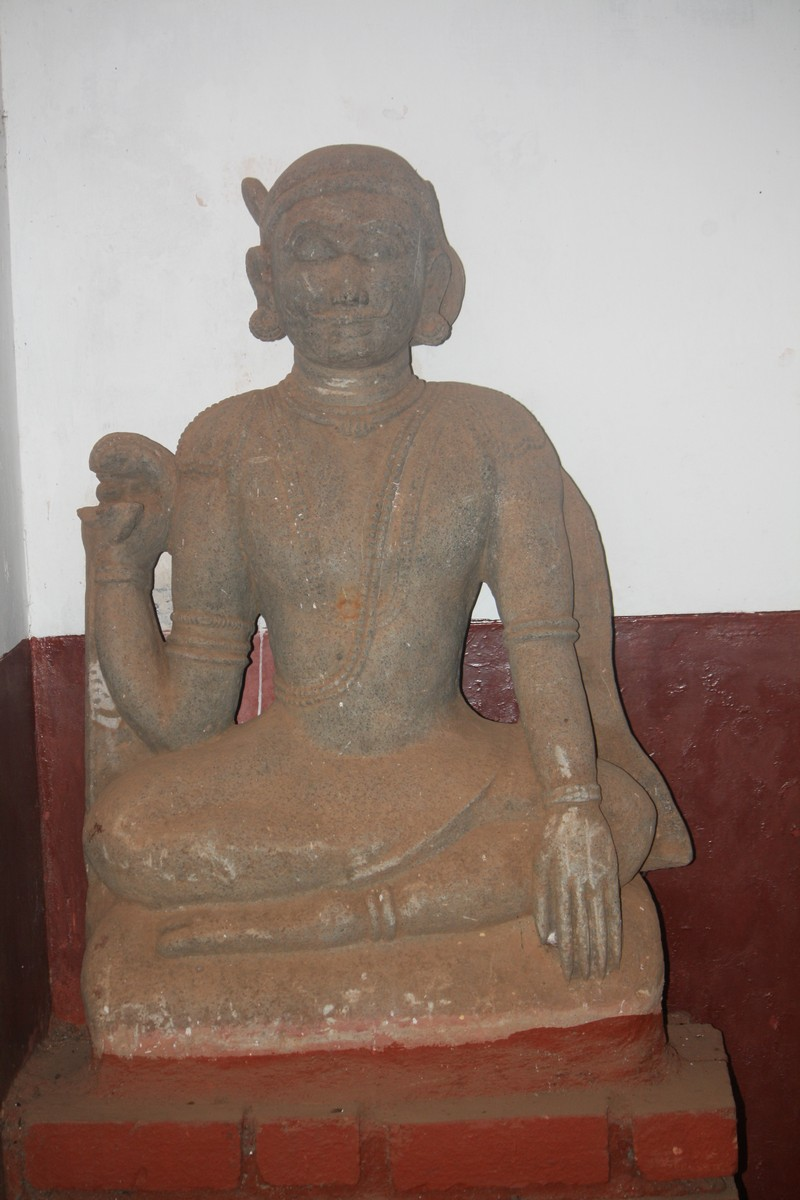

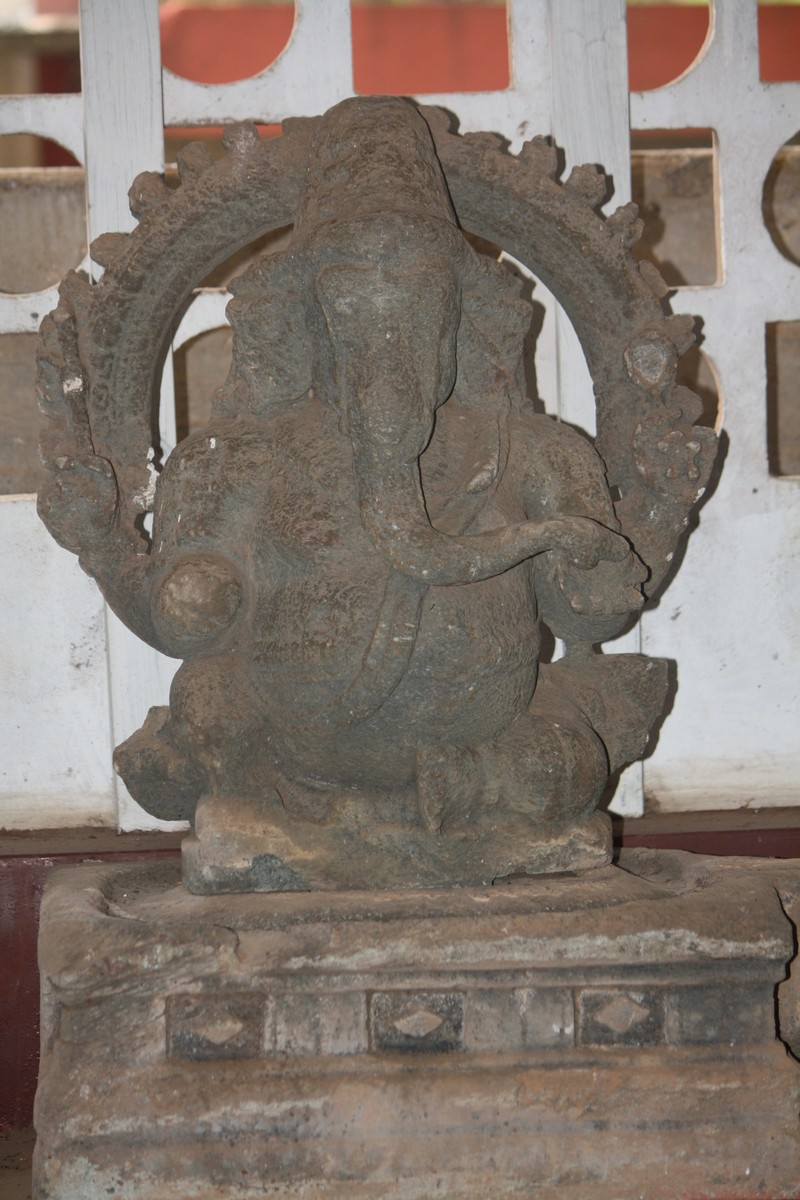

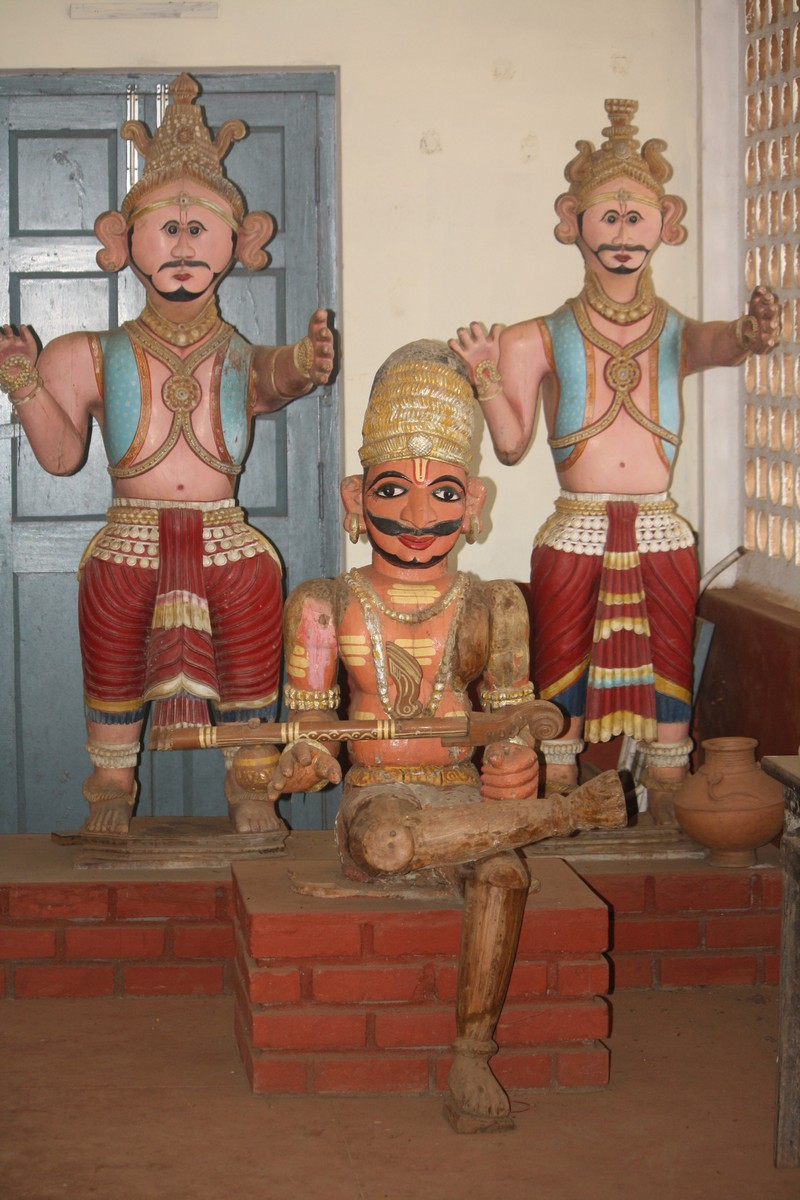

== See also ==
- Kuvempu
- G. S. Shivarudrappa
- Rashtra Kavi Govinda Pai Samshodhana Kendra (Research Centre)
