= Veerabhadreswarar Temple =

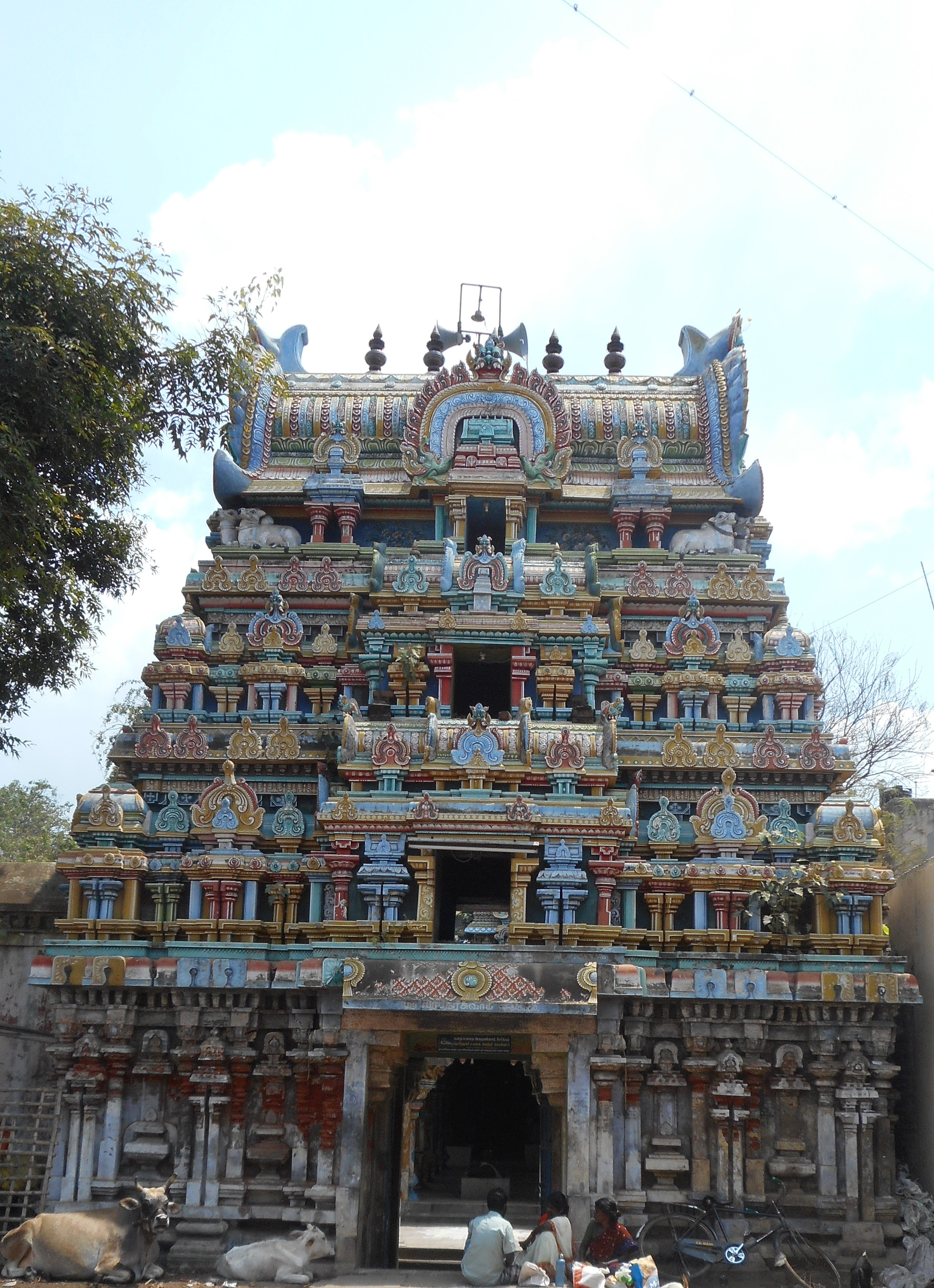
Entrance

Veerabhadreswarar Temple is a Hindu temple located in the town of Kumbakonam in the Thanjavur district of Tamil Nadu, India.

== Deities ==
The presiding deity is the Agora Veerabhadra and the goddess is Bhadrakali.

== Significance ==
The temple faces west unlike most other Hindu temples. Ottakoothar wrote his seminal work Thakka Yaga Barani here.
