= Crossover interference =

Phenomenon in genetics

Crossover interference is the term used to refer to the non-random placement of crossovers with respect to each other during meiosis. The term is attributed to Hermann Joseph Muller, who observed that one crossover "interferes with the coincident occurrence of another crossing over in the same pair of chromosomes, and I have accordingly termed this phenomenon ‘interference’."

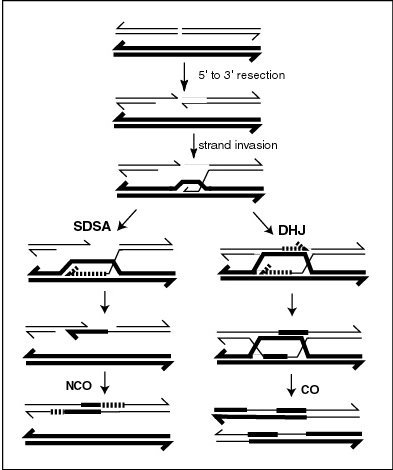
A current model of meiotic recombination, initiated by a double-strand break or gap, followed by pairing with an homologous chromosome and strand invasion to initiate the recombinational repair process. Repair of the gap can lead to crossover (CO) or non-crossover (NCO) of the flanking regions. CO recombination is thought to occur by the Double Holliday Junction (DHJ) model, illustrated on the right, above. NCO recombinants are thought to occur primarily by the Synthesis Dependent Strand Annealing (SDSA) model, illustrated on the left, above. Most recombination events appear to be the SDSA type.

Meiotic crossovers (COs) appear to be regulated to ensure that COs on the same chromosome are distributed far apart (crossover interference). In the nematode worm Caenorhabditis elegans, meiotic double-strand breaks (DSBs) outnumber COs. Thus not all DSBs are repaired by a recombination process(es) leading to COs. The RTEL-1 protein is required to prevent excess meiotic COs. In rtel-1 mutants meiotic CO recombination is significantly increased and crossover interference appears to be absent. RTEL1 likely acts by promoting synthesis-dependent strand annealing which results in non-crossover (NCO) recombinants instead of COs (see diagram). Normally, about half of all DSBs are converted into NCOs. RTEL-1 appears to enforce meiotic crossover interference by directing the repair of some DSBs towards NCOs rather than COs.

In humans, recombination rate increases with maternal age. Furthermore, placement of female recombination events appears to become increasingly deregulated with maternal age, with a larger fraction of events occurring within closer proximity to each other than would be expected under simple models of crossover interference.

== Interfering and non-interfering crossovers ==
In most organisms, the primary meiotic crossover pathway produces class I crossovers that are subject to interference, while alternative class II pathways can produce crossovers that are indifferent to interference. Class I is the major crossover pathway in most species, whereas class II crossovers generally lack interference.

== High negative interference ==
=== Bacteriophage T4 ===
High negative interference (HNI), in contrast to positive interference, refers to the association of recombination events ordinarily measured over short genomic distances, usually within a gene. Over such short distances there is a positive correlation (negative interference) of recombinational events. As studied in bacteriophage T4 this correlation is greater the shorter the interval between the sites used for detection. HNI is due to multiple exchanges within a short region of the genome during an individual mating event. What is counted as a “single exchange” in a genetic cross involving only distant markers may in reality be a complex event that is distributed over a finite region of the genome. Switching between template DNA strands during DNA synthesis (see Figure, SDSA pathway), referred to as copy-choice recombination, was proposed to explain the positive correlation of recombination events within the gene. HNI appears to require fairly precise base complementarity in the regions of the parental genomes where the associated recombination events occur.

=== HIV ===
Each human immunodeficiency virus (HIV) particle contains two single-stranded positive sense RNA genomes. After infection of a host cell, a DNA copy of the genome is formed by reverse transcription of the RNA genomes. Reverse transcription is accompanied by template switching between the two RNA genome copies (copy-choice recombination). From 5 to 14 recombination events per genome occur at each replication cycle. This recombination exhibits HNI. HNI is apparently caused by correlated template switches during minus-strand DNA synthesis. Template switching recombination appears to be necessary for maintaining genome integrity and as a repair mechanism for salvaging damaged genomes.
