= Issuru =

Village in Shimoga, Karnataka, India

Coordinates: 14.202769°N 75.354213°E

Isuru is a village in Shimoga district of Karnataka, India.

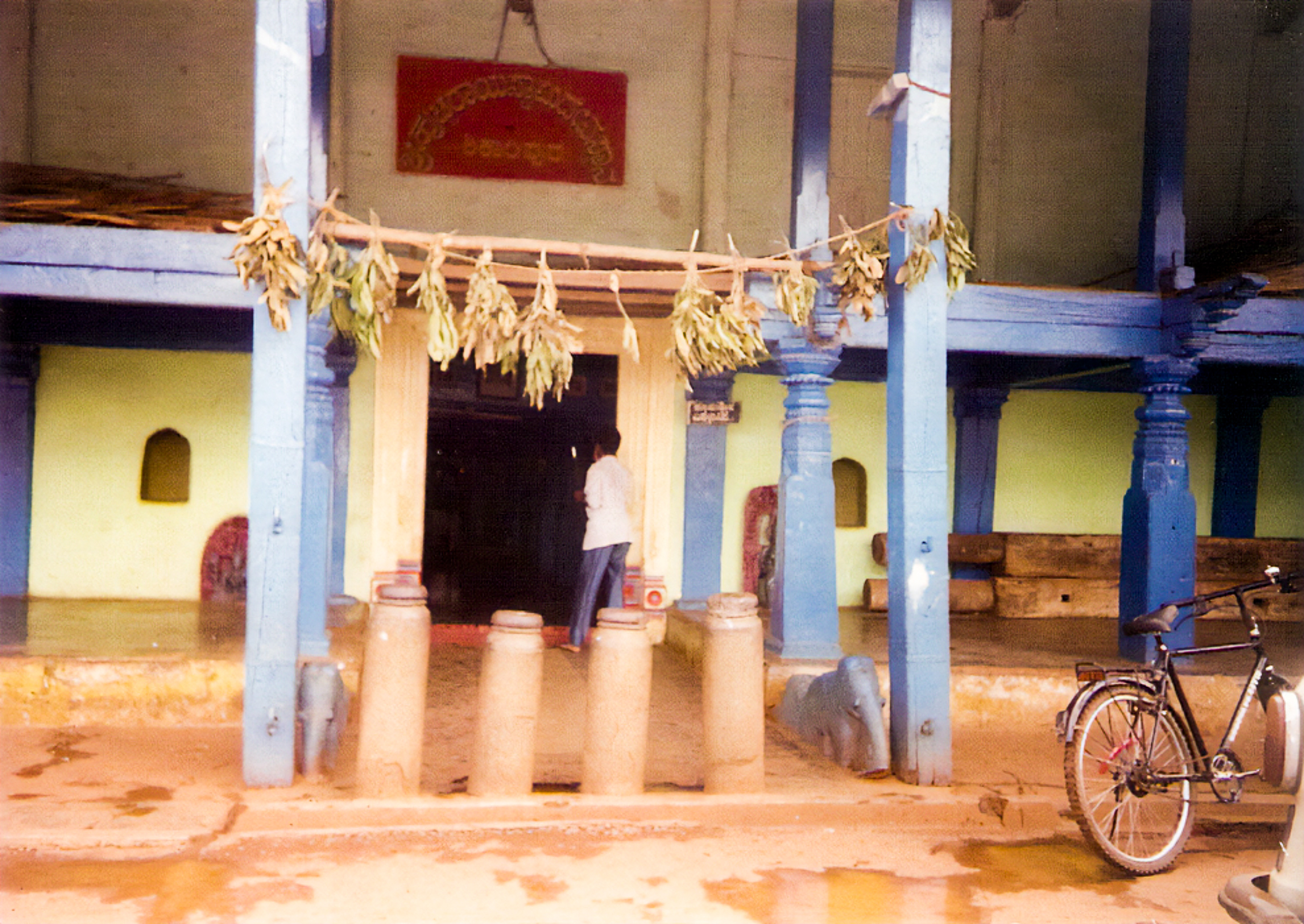
Hucharaya Swamy Temple

== Location ==
Issuru village is located 46.6 km north of Shimoga town in southwestern Karnataka. It is ten kilometers from the nearest town of Shikaripur. Issuru is administered from Shikarpur block office coming under Shimoga Tehsil.

== Demographics ==
Issuru village has 4,674 people, according to the 2011 census.

== History ==
In 1942, Issuru attracted national attention when the villagers declared independence of the village from the British government who ruled India at that time. They blockaded the village and prevented the British officers from collecting tax. In the confrontation that followed, two British officers were killed by the villagers and the criminal case registered culminated in the hanging of four freedom fighters.This incidence is also called chauri chaura of Karnataka.

== Major freedom fighters from the 1942 movement ==
5 young men under the age of 30 were executed at Bangalore(Now Bengaluru) jail:

- Gurappa Kammar (K. Gurappa)
- Jinahalli Mallappa
- Suryanarayanachar
- Badekalli Halappa
- Gowdru Shankarappa (Shankarappa Gowda)
