= Dharmananda Damodar Kosambi =

Indian scholar and language expert (1876–1947)

Dharmananda Kosambi
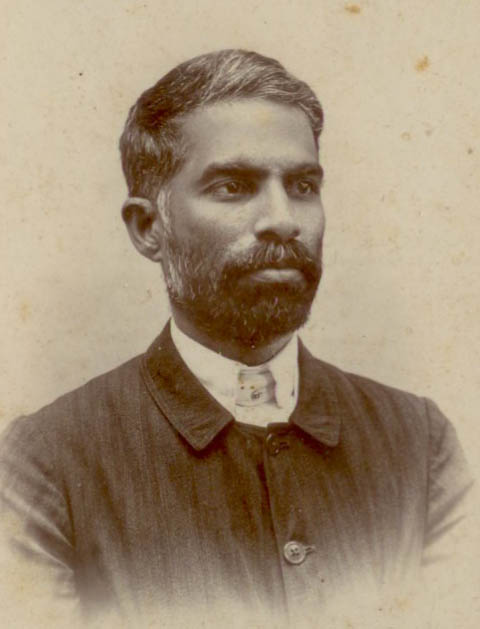
- Born: 9 October 1876; Sancoale, Goa, Portuguese India
- Died: 4 June 1947 (aged 70); Sevagram, British India
- Occupations: Buddhist scholar and Pāli language expert
- Spouse: Balabai Gangubai (m. 1892)
- Children: 2 including Damodar
- Relatives: Meera Kosambi (granddaughter)

Signature
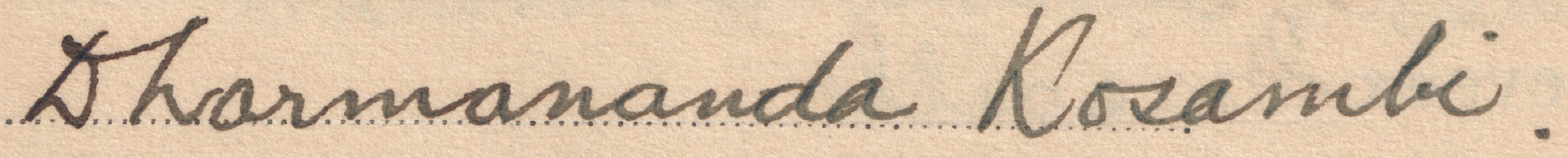

Dharmananda Damodar Kosambi (9 October 1876 – 4 June 1947) was an Indian Buddhist scholar and Pāli language expert. He was the father of the mathematician and prominent Marxist historian Damodar Dharmananda Kosambi.

== Biography ==
Kosambi was born in the Sancoale village of Portuguese Goa in 1876 in orthodox Gaud Saraswat Brahmin (GSB) family. He was married at the age of sixteen. He was passionately interested in knowledge and felt that married life would not allow him to pursue this goal. He thus attempted to leave home several times, but lacked the courage to do so and he returned to his family. However, after the birth of his first daughter, Manik, he did leave his family not returning for nearly four years. Needless to say, his wife, Balabai, suffered during these years, as it was uncommon at the time for a married man to leave his wife and family. Later, Kosambi first traveled to Pune with an intention to learn Sanskrit. From Pune, he traveled to Varanasi after brief sojourns in Ujjain, Indore, Gwalior and Prayag. At Varanasi, he diligently learnt Sanskrit under the tutelage of Gangadharpant Shastri and Nageshwarpant Dharmadhikari. He faced many difficulties in Kashi while attempting to provide for himself. He had to work hard to earn enough to eat and maintain accommodation. To make matters worse, Kashi was affected by a severe epidemic during his time there. Still, he made phenomenal progress in Sanskrit.

Over the next three years, he traveled to Nepal to study Buddhism in its original language, Pāli. However, he was rather disappointed with the dismal state of Buddhism there and instead continued on to Calcutta and then to Ceylon (Sri Lanka), where he enrolled himself in the Vidyodaya College. He studied there for three years under the tutelage of Hikkaduwe Sri Sumangala Thera and was ordained as a Buddhist monk in 1902. Later, he went to Burma (Myanmar) and undertook comparative study of Buddhist texts in Burmese language. After spending seven years abroad, Kosambi returned to India.

He started working as a reader at the University of Calcutta and brought his wife and daughter Manik to Calcutta. His son Damodar was born in 1907. Later, Dharmananda gave up his university job to work as a research fellow in Baroda. Later, he started lecturing all over Western India, and finally moved to Fergusson College in Pune. In Bombay he met Dr. James Woods from Harvard University, who was seeking a scholar adept in Sanskrit, Ardhamāgadhı̄, and Pāli. Woods invited Kosambi to Harvard, to complete the task of compiling a critical edition of Visuddhimagga, a book on Buddhist philosophy. Kosambi traveled via England to Harvard in 1910, and was due to stay for two years. At Harvard, Kosambi learned Russian and took a keen interest in Marxism. He traveled to the Soviet Union in 1929 and taught Pāli at Leningrad University.

When the Indian independence movement was at its peak, Kosambi returned to India and taught at Gujarat Vidyapith without remuneration. He also started recruiting volunteers for Salt Satyagraha. He was imprisoned for six years for participating in the Salt Satyagraha, which certainly took a toll on his health.

Besides Buddhist works, Kosambi also studied and translated many Jain works. Later, Kosambi founded Bahujanavihara, a shelter house for Buddhist monks in Bombay, which exists to this day.

== Death ==
Under the influence of Jainism, Kosambi decided to give up his life through sallekhana (voluntary fasting). Gandhiji requested that he move to Wardha for naturopathy and reconsider his decision to fast unto death. He moved to Sevagram, near Wardha, but kept his diet to a spoon of bitter gourd (karela) juice in order to respect Gandhi's wishes. He wanted to die on Buddha Pournima but lived beyond it for a few days. The end came after 30 days of fasting in June 1947.

== Works ==
He authored one of the most popular biographies of Buddha, Bhagwan Buddha (1940) in Marathi. It was later translated in English and in other Indian languages by Central Sahitya Akademi. Besides Bhagwan Buddha, Kosambi also authored eleven books on Buddhism and Jainism. He also wrote a play titled "Bodhisatva" in Marathi which sketches the life of Gautama Buddha in story form. His autobiography, written in Marathi, is called Nivedan which was a serialized column published in a Panjim-based periodical called ‘Bharat’ from November 1912 till February 1916.

=== Bibliography ===
- Dharmanand Kosambi: The Essential Writings, ed. by Meera Kosambi. Orient Blackswan, 2013.
- Bhagawan Buddha by Dharmanand Kosambi, Sahitya Akademi.
- Nivedan: The Autobiography of Dharmanand Kosambi, trans. by Meera Kosambi. Ranikhet: Permanent Black, 2011.
