= Index of genetics articles =

Genetics (from Ancient Greek γενετικός genetikos, "genite" and that from γένεσις genesis, “origin”), a discipline of biology, is the science of heredity and variation in living organisms.

Articles (arranged alphabetically) related to genetics include:

== # ==
- 3' end
- 5' end

== A ==
- Acentric chromosome
- Achondroplasia
- Active site
- Adam's Curse
- Adaptation
- Adenine
- Adenosine
- Adenovirus
- Adenosine diphosphate (ADP)
- Ala
- Alagille syndrome
- Albino
- Alcoholism
- Alkylating agent
- Allele
- Allele frequency
- Alleles
- Allopolyploid
- Allosteric protein
- Allozyme
- Alternative splicing
- Altruism
- Alu family
- Alzheimer's disease
- Amber codon
- Ames test
- Amino acid
- Amino acid sequence
- Amino acids
- Amniocentesis
- Amorph
- AMP
- Amphidiploid
- Amplification
- Anagenesis
- Anaphase
- Aneuploid
- Aneuploid cell
- Aneuploidy
- Angelman syndrome
- Angiosperm
- Animal model
- Annealing
- Annotation
- Antibody
- Anticipation
- Anticoding strand
- Anticodon
- Antigen
- Antimorph
- Antiparallel
- Antisense
- Antisense RNA
- Antisense strand
- Antisense therapy
- AP endonuclease
- AP site
- Apert syndrome
- Apoptosis
- Applied genetics
- Arg
- Arrayed library
- Ascospore
- Ascus
- Asexual spore
- Asn
- Asp
- Assortative mating
- Atavism
- ATP
- Attenuator
- Autogamy
- Autopolyploid
- Autoradiograph
- Autoradiography
- Autosomal dominant
- Autosome
- Autotroph
- Auxotroph
- Auxotrophic mutant
- Axoneme

== B ==
- B form DNA
- Bacillus
- Back mutation
- Backcross
- Bacteria
- Bacterial conjugation
- Bacterial lawn
- Bacteriophage
- Balbiani ring
- Barr body
- Basal body
- Base
- Base analogue
- Base pair
- Base pairs
- Base sequence
- Batesian mimicry
- Bayesian analysis
- Bead theory
- Behavioral genetics
- Behavioural genetics
- Beta-galactosidase
- Bimodal distribution
- Binary fission
- Binomial expansion
- Binomial theorem
- Biochemical genetics
- Bioinformatics
- Biolistic
- Bioremediation
- Biotechnology
- Biparental zygote
- Birth defect
- Bivalent (genetics)
- BLAST
- Blastoderm
- Blastomere
- Blastopore
- Blastula
- Blending inheritance
- Blunt-end ligation
- Bookmarking
- Brachydactyly
- Branch migration
- BRCA1
- BRCA2
- Bud
- Buoyant density
- Burkitt lymphoma

== C ==
- Cancer
- Candidate gene
- Capillary array
- Carcinogen
- Carcinoma
- Carrier
- Carrier testing
- Cat coat genetics
- cDNA
- cDNA library
- Cell
- Centimorgan
- Central dogma of molecular biology
- Centromere
- Chemical base
- Chimeraplasty
- Chromomere
- Chromosomal crossover
- Chromosomal deletion
- Chromosome
- Chromosome banding
- Chromosome painting
- Chromosome region p
- Chromosome region q
- Classical genetics
- Cleft lip
- Cleft palate
- Clinical geneticist
- Clone (genetics)
- Clone bank
- Cloned DNA
- Cloning
- Cloning vector
- Coccus
- Code
- Coding strand
- Codominance
- Codon
- Codon usage bias aka Codon preference
- Cohesive end
- Cointegrate
- Col plasmid
- Colonoscopy
- Colony
- Common ancestry
- Comparative genomics
- Compartment
- Competence factor
- Competent
- Complementary DNA
- Complementation
- Complementation test
- Complete linkage
- Complex trait
- Composite transposon
- Concordance
- Conditional mutation
- Confidence limits
- Confidentiality
- Congenital
- Conjugation tube
- Consanguineous
- Consanguinity
- Consensus sequence
- Conserved sequence
- Constant region
- Constitutive gene
- Contig
- Contig map
- Contig maps
- Contiguous genes
- Continuous variation
- Controlling element
- Copper fist
- Corepressor
- Cosegregation
- Cosmid
- Cosmids
- Cot value
- Cotransduction
- Cotransformation
- Coupling
- Covariance
- cpDNA
- CpG island
- Craniosynostosis
- Cri du chat
- Cross
- Cross-fertilization
- Crossbreed
- Crossover
- Crossovers
- Cryptic coloration
- Culture
- Cyclic AMP
- Cys
- Cystic fibrosis
- Cytidine
- Cytochrome
- Cytogenetic map
- Cytogenetics
- Cytohet
- Cytokinesis
- Cytological band
- Cytological map
- Cytoplasm
- Cytoplasmic trait
- Cytosine
- Cytosol

== D ==
- D-loop
- Darwinian fitness
- Data warehouse
- Dauermodification
- Deficiency
- Degenerate code
- Degenerate codon
- Degrees of freedom (physics and chemistry)
- Deletion
- Deletion map
- Deletion mapping
- Deme (biology)
- Dementia
- Denaturation
- Deoxyribonuclease
- Deoxyribonucleotide
- Deoxyribose
- Derepressed
- Determinant
- Deterministic
- Developmental biology
- Diabetes mellitus
- Diakinesis
- Dicentric chromosome
- Dictyotene
- Dideoxy method
- Differentiation
- Dihybrid
- Dihybrid cross
- Dimerization
- Dimorphism
- Dioecious plant
- Diploid
- Directed evolution
- Directed mutagenesis
- Directed sequencing
- Directionality (molecular biology)
- Disease
- Disruptive selection
- Distribution
- DMD
- DNA
- DNA bank
- DNA clone
- DNA cloning
- DNA fingerprint
- DNA glycosylase
- DNA gyrase
- DNA hybridization
- DNA ligase
- DNA marker
- DNA polymerase
- DNA probe
- DNA repair genes
- DNA replication
- DNA sequence
- DNA sequencing
- Docking protein
- Domain
- Dominant
- Dominant allele
- Dosage compensation
- Dose
- Dot blotting
- Double helix
- Doublesex
- Down syndrome
- Downstream
- Draft sequence
- Duplicate gene
- Dwarfism
- Dyad
- Dyad symmetry
- Dystonia

== E ==
- E (exit site)
- Ecdysone
- Ecological genetics
- Ectopic expression
- Electrophoresis
- Electroporation
- ELSI
- Endomitosis
- Endonuclease
- Endopolyploidy
- Endosperm
- Enforced outbreeding
- Enhancer
- Enhancer trap
- Enriched medium
- Enucleate cell
- Enzyme
- Epigenetics
- Episome
- Epistasis
- Equational division
- Equivalence group
- Erythrocytes
- Escherichia coli
- Ethics
- Ethidium
- Euchromatin
- Eugenics
- Eukaryote
- Eukaryotic cell
- Euploid
- Euploidy
- European Journal of Human Genetics
- Evolution
- Evolutionary rate
- Excision repair
- Exconjugant
- Exogenote
- Exogenous DNA
- Exon
- Exon shuffling
- Exonuclease
- Expected progeny difference
- Experimental design
- Expressed gene
- Expression vector
- Expressivity (genetics)

== F ==
- F factor
- F plus cell
- F- cell
- F-duction
- F-pili
- F1 generation
- F2 generation
- Factorial
- Familial cancer
- Familial trait
- Family selection
- Fanconi anemia
- Fate map
- Fecundity selection
- Feedback inhibition
- Fibroblasts
- Filial generation
- Fingerprint
- Fingerprinting
- FISH (Fluorescent in situ hybridization)
- Fitness (biology)
- Fixed allele
- Flow cytometry
- Flow karyotyping
- Fluctuation test
- Fluorescent in situ hybridization
- FMET
- Footprinting
- Forensics
- Founder effect
- Fragile site
- Fragile X syndrome
- Frameshift
- Frameshift mutation
- Fraternal twin
- Frequency histogram
- Fruiting body
- Full gene sequence
- Functional genomics
- Fundamental number

== G ==
- G-banding
- Galton Laboratory
- Gamete
- Gametophyte
- Gastrulation
- GC-rich area
- Gel electrophoresis
- Gene
- Gene chip technology
- Gene cloning
- Gene complex
- Gene conversion
- Gene dose
- Gene duplication
- Gene expression
- Gene family
- Gene flow
- Gene frequency
- Gene fusion
- Gene interaction
- Gene library
- Gene locus
- Gene map
- Gene mapping
- Gene markers
- Gene mutation
- Gene orders
- Gene pool
- Gene prediction
- Gene product
- Gene regulatory network
- Gene testing
- Gene theft
- Gene therapy
- Gene transfer
- Genetic algorithm
- Genetic architecture
- Genetic carrier
- Genetic code
- Genetic counseling
- Genetic deletion
- Genetic determinism
- Genetic disorder
- Genetic diversity
- Genetic drift
- Genetic engineering
- Genetic genealogy
- Genetic history of Europe
- Genetic illness
- Genetic informatics
- Genetic linkage map
- Genetic load
- Genetic map
- Genetic marker
- Genetic material
- Genetic mosaic
- Genetic polymorphism
- Genetic screen
- Genetic screening
- Genetic testing
- Genetic variance
- Genetic variation
- Geneticist
- Genetics
- Genetics and archaeogenetics of South Asia
- Genome
- Genome map
- Genome project
- Genome screen
- Genomic library
- Genomic sequence
- Genomics
- Genophore
- Genotype
- Germ cell
- Germ line
- Germ-line theory
- Germinal mutation
- Germline mutation
- Giemsa stain
- Gln
- Glutamic acid
- Gly
- God gene
- Gradient
- gRNA
- Ground state
- Group 1 intron
- Group II intron
- Group selection
- Guanine
- Guanosine
- Guide RNA
- Gynandromorph

== H ==
- H-Y antigen
- Haemoglobin (hb)
- Haemophilia
- Haplodiploidy
- Haploid
- Haploidization
- Haploinsufficiency
- Haplotype
- Hardy–Weinberg law
- Harlequin chromosome
- HAT medium
- Hayflick limit
- Heat-shock protein
- Helicase
- Hemizygous
- Hemizygous gene
- Hemophilia
- Hereditary cancer
- Hereditary mutation
- Heredity
- Heritability
- Hermaphrodite
- Heterochromatin
- Heteroduplex
- Heteroduplex DNA
- Heterogametic sex
- Heterogamy
- Genetic heterogeneity
- Heterokaryon
- Heteroplasmon
- Heteroplasmy
- Heterothallic
- Heterotroph
- Heterozygosity
- Heterozygote
- Heterozygous
- Heterozygous DNA
- Hexaploid
- Hfr cell
- Human Genome Project
- HHMI
- His
- Histone
- HnRNA
- Hogness box
- Holandric trait
- Holoenzyme
- Holoprosencephaly
- Homeo-box
- Homeo-domain
- Homeobox
- Homeosis
- Homogametic sex
- Homolog
- Homologue
- Homology
- Homoplasmy
- Homothallic
- Homothallic fungus
- Homozygote
- Homozygous
- Homozygous gene pair
- Hormone
- Host range
- Hot spot
- Housekeeping genes
- HUGO
- Human gene therapy
- Human genetics
- Human genome
- Human Genome Project
- Huntington's disease
- Hybrid (biology)
- Hybrid DNA
- Hybrid dysgenesis
- Hybrid plasmid
- Hybrid zone
- Hybridoma
- Hydrogen bond
- Hydroxyapatite
- Hypermorph
- Hyperploid
- Hypervariable region
- Hypomorph
- Hypoploid
- Hypostatic gene

== I ==
- Ichthyosis
- Identical twin
- Identity by descent
- Identity by type
- Idiogram
- Idiotypic variation
- Ile
- Imago
- Immune system
- immunity
- Immunoglobulin (Ig)
- Immunoglobulin gene
- Immunohistochemistry
- Immunotherapy
- Imprinting
- Indigenous Amerindian genetics
- In situ
- Introduction to genetics
- In vitro
- In vitro mutagenesis
- In vivo
- Inbreeding
- Incestuous
- Inclusive fitness
- Incomplete dominance
- Inducer
- Induction
- Industrial melanism
- Informed consent
- Inherit
- Inherited
- Initiation codon
- Initiation
- Initiation
- Initiator protein
- Inosine
- Insertion
- Insertional mutation
- Intercalating agent
- Interference
- Interkinesis
- Interphase
- Interrupted mating
- Intersex
- Intron
- Introns
- Inversion
- Ionizing radiation
- IR
- IS
- IS element
- Isochromosome
- Isoenzyme
- Isoschizomer
- Isotope
- Isozyme

== J ==
- Junk DNA

== K ==
- Kappa particle
- Kartagener's syndrome
- Karyokinesis
- Karyotype
- Kilobase
- Kin selection
- Kinetochore
- Klinefelter syndrome
- Knockout

== L ==
- Lac operon
- Lagging strand
- Lambda phage
- Lateral inhibition
- Leader peptide gene
- Leader sequence (mRNA)
- Leading strand
- Leaky mutant
- Lesion
- Lethal gene
- Leu
- Leucine zipper
- Leukemia
- Li-Fraumeni syndrome
- Library (genetics)
- Ligase
- Cell line
- Genetic linkage
- Linkage analysis
- Linkage equilibrium
- Linkage group
- Linkage map
- Linking number
- Locus
- Lod score
- Lod score method
- Lymphocyte
- Lymphoma
- Lyon hypothesis
- Lys
- Lysate
- Lysis
- Lysogen
- Lysogenic

== M ==
- Macromolecule
- Macrorestriction map
- Malformation
- Gene mapping
- Marfan syndrome
- Marker gene
- Mass spectrometry
- Maternal effect
- Maternal inheritance
- Mating type
- Medium
- Megabase
- Meiocyte
- Meiosis
- Meiospore
- Melanoma
- Melting of DNA
- Mendel's first law
- Mendel's second law
- Mendelian ratio
- Merozygote
- Messenger RNA
- Met
- Metabolism
- Metafemale
- Metamale
- Metamere
- Metaphase
- Metaphase plate
- Metastasis
- Methylation
- Microarray
- Microbial genetics
- Microinjection
- Micronuclei
- Microsatellite
- Microtubules
- Midparent value
- Mimicry
- Minimal medium
- Mismatch repair
- Missense mutation
- Mitochondrial DNA
- Mitochondrial Eve
- Human mitochondrial genetics
- Mitochondrion
- Mitosis
- Mitotic apparatus
- Mitotic crossover
- Model organisms
- Modifier gene
- Molecular biology
- Molecular chaperone
- Molecular farming
- Molecular genetics
- Molecular imprinting
- Molecular medicine
- Monocistronic mRNA
- Monoclonal antibody
- Monoecious plant
- Monogenic disorder
- Monohybrid
- Monohybrid cross
- Monoploid
- Monosomic
- Monosomy
- Morbid map
- Morphogenesis
- Mosaic (genetics)
- Mosaicism
- Mouse model
- mRNA
- mtDNA
- Mu phage
- Müllerian mimicry
- Multifactorial
- Multimeric structure
- Multiple allelism
- Multiplexing
- Murine
- Mutability
- Mutagen
- Mutagenicity
- Mutant
- Mutant allele
- Mutant screening
- Mutation
- Mutation breeding
- Mutation event
- Mutation frequency
- Mutation rate
- Mutational load
- Muton
- Myeloma
- Myotonic dystrophy

== N ==
- N-end rule
- Narrow heritability
- Natural selection
- Negative control
- Neo-Darwinism
- Neomorph
- Neoplasm
- Neurofibromatosis
- Neurospora
- Neutral mutation
- Neutral petite
- NF
- Nickase
- Nicking
- NIH
- Nitrogen base
- Nitrogenous base
- Non-coding DNA
- Non-coding strand
- Non-disjunction
- Non-histone protein
- Non-Mendelian ratio
- Nonsense codon
- Nonsense mutation
- Nonsense suppressor
- Noonan syndrome
- Norm of reaction
- Normal distribution
- Northern analysis
- Northern blot
- NPD
- Nuclear transfer
- Nuclease
- Nucleic acid
- Nucleoid
- Nucleolar organizer
- Nucleolus
- Nucleoprotein
- Nucleoside
- Nucleosome
- Nucleotide
- Nucleotide pair
- Nucleotides
- Nucleus
- Null allele
- Null hypothesis
- Nullisomic
- Nurse cell

== O ==
- Ochre codon
- Okazaki fragment
- Oligo
- Oligogenic
- Oligonucleotide
- Oncogene
- Oncogenes
- Oncovirus
- Oocyte
- Oogenesis
- Oogonia
- Opal codon
- Open reading frame
- Operator (biology)
- Operon
- Organelle
- Organogenesis
- Outbreeding
- Overdominance
- Overlapping clones
- Ovum

== P ==
- P (peptidyl) site
- P element
- P1
- P53
- Palindrome
- Panmictic
- Paralogous genes
- Paramecin
- Parameters
- Parental
- Parental ditype
- Parental imprinting
- Parkinson's disease
- Parthenogenesis
- Partial digest
- Partial dominance
- Pascal's triangle
- Patent
- Pathogen
- Pattern formation
- PCR
- PD
- Pedigree
- Penetrance
- Peptide
- Peptide bond
- Peptidyl transferase
- PEST hypothesis
- Petite mutation
- Phage
- Pharmacogenomics
- Pharming (genetics)
- Phe
- Phenocopy
- Phenotype
- Phenotypic variance
- Phenylketonuria
- Pheromone
- Phosphodiester bond
- Photoreactivation
- Phyletic evolution
- Phyletic gradualism
- Phylogenetic tree
- Phylogenetics
- Physical map
- Piebald
- Pilus
- PKU
- Plant breeding
- Plasmid
- Plastid
- Pleiotropic mutation
- Pleiotropy
- Pluripotency
- Point mutation
- Poisson distribution
- Polar body
- Polar mutation
- Polar overdominance
- Polarity
- Polarity gene
- Pollen grain
- Poly(A) tail
- Polyacrylamide
- Polycistronic
- Polycistronic mRNA
- Polydactyly
- Polygene
- Polygenic disorder
- Polymerase
- Polymerize
- Polymorphism
- Polypeptide
- Polyploid
- Polyribosome
- Polysaccharide
- Polysome
- Polytene chromosome
- Population
- Population bottleneck
- Population genetics
- Position effect
- Positional cloning
- Positive control
- Pre-mRNA
- Predisposition
- Prenatal diagnosis
- Pribnow box
- Primary oocyte
- Primary spermatocyte
- Primary structure
- Primary transcript
- Primase
- Primer
- Primosome
- Prion
- Privacy
- Pro
- Probability
- Probability theory
- Proband
- Probe
- Processivity
- Product rule
- Proflavin
- Progeny testing
- Prognosis
- Prokaryote
- Prokaryotic cell
- Promoter
- Pronucleus
- Proofread
- Prophage
- Prophase
- Prophylactic surgery
- Proplastid
- Propositus
- Protease
- Protein
- Protein splicing
- Proteome
- Proteomics
- Proteus syndrome
- Proto-oncogene
- Protoplast
- Prototroph
- Provirus
- Pseudoallele
- Pseudoautosomal region
- Pseudodominance
- Pseudogene
- Public policy
- Punnett square
- Purine
- Purines
- Pyrimidine

== Q ==
- Quaternary structure

== R ==
- R factor
- R plasmid
- Radiation hybrid
- Random genetic drift
- Random mating
- Rare-cutter enzyme
- Reading frame
- Recessive allele
- Recessive gene
- Reciprocal altruism
- Reciprocal cross
- Recombinant
- Recombinant clone
- Recombinant DNA
- Recon
- Reduction division
- Regression
- Regulator gene
- Renal cell cancer
- Renal cell carcinoma
- Repeat sequences
- Repetitive DNA
- Replica plating
- Replication fork
- Replicon
- Replisome
- Reporter gene
- Repression
- Repressor
- Reproductive cells
- Reproductive success
- Repulsion (genetics)
- Restriction digest
- Restriction enzyme
- Restriction enzymes
- Restriction map
- Retinitis pigmentosa
- Retinoblastoma
- Retroviral infection
- Retrovirus
- Reverse genetics
- Reversion
- RF
- RFLP
- RFLP mapping
- Rho
- Ribonucleic acid
- Ribonucleotide
- Ribose
- Ribosomal protein
- Ribosomal RNA
- Ribosome
- Ribosomes
- Ribozyme
- Risk communication
- RNA
- RNA editing
- RNA phage
- RNA polymerase
- RNA replicase
- RNA splicing
- Robertsonian fusion
- rRNA

== S ==
- S (Svedberg unit)
- Sanger sequence
- Sanger sequencing
- Sarcoma
- Satellite
- Satellite chromosome
- Satellite DNA
- Scaffold
- Scientific method
- Secondary oocyte
- Secondary structure
- Sedimentation
- Segmentation (biology)
- Segregation
- Selection
- Selective medium
- Self
- Self-assembly
- Self-fertilization
- Selfed
- Selfish DNA
- Sense strand
- Sequence
- Sequence assembly
- Sequence tagged site
- Sequencing
- Sex chromosome
- Sex chromosomes
- Sex determination
- Sex linkage
- Sex linked
- Sex reversal
- Sex-influenced trait
- Sex-lethal
- Sex-limited trait
- Sex-linked
- Sexduction
- Sexual selection
- Shotgun method
- Shotgun sequencing
- Shotgun technique
- Shuttle vector
- Sickle-cell disease
- Sigma factor
- Signal peptide
- Signal peptide
- Silent gene
- Silent mutation
- SINE
- Single-gene disorder
- Sister chromatids
- Skew
- Smooth endoplasmic reticulum
- SNP
- SnRNP
- Sociobiology
- Somatic cell
- Somatic cells
- Somatic mutation
- Somatic mutations
- Somatostatin
- SOS box
- SOS repair
- SOS response
- Southern blot
- Southern blotting
- Spacer DNA
- Speciation
- Speciation (genetic algorithm)
- Species
- Specific-locus test
- Spectral karyotype
- Sperm
- Spermatid
- Spermatocyte
- Spermatogenesis
- Spermatogonium
- Spermatozoon
- Spermiogenesis
- Spina bifida
- Spindle
- Spiral cleavage
- Spirillum
- Splice site
- Spliceosome
- Spontaneous mutation
- Sporadic cancer
- Spore
- Sporophyte
- Standard deviation
- Statistic
- Statistics
- Stem cell
- Stem-loop structure
- Steroid receptor
- Stochastic
- Strain
- Stringent response
- Structural gene
- Structural genomics
- Substantial equivalence
- Substitution
- Suicide gene
- Supercoil
- Supercoiling
- Supergene
- Superinfection
- Suppressor gene
- Suppressor mutation
- Svedberg unit
- Swivelase
- Sympatric speciation
- Synapsis
- Synaptonemal complex
- Syncytium
- Syndrome
- Synexpression
- Syngeneic
- Synteny

== T ==
- T-cell receptor
- T-DNA
- Tandem duplication
- Targeted mutagenesis
- TATA box
- Tay–Sachs disease
- Technology transfer
- Telomerase
- Telomere
- Telophase
- Temperate phage
- Template strand
- Teratogen
- Teratogenic
- Teratogens
- Terminator sequence
- Tertiary structure
- Test cross
- Tetrad
- Tetrad analysis
- Tetraploid
- Tetratype (T)
- Theta structure
- Thr
- Three-point cross
- Thymidine
- Thymine
- Thymine dimer
- Ti plasmid
- Topoisomer
- Topoisomerase
- Totipotency
- Totipotent
- Toxicogenomics
- Trait (biological)
- Trans
- Trans-acting
- Transcription
- Transcription factor
- Transcriptome
- Transduction
- Transfection
- Transfer RNA
- Transferase
- Transform
- Transformation
- Transformer
- Transgenic
- Transgenic organism
- Transgressive phenotype
- Transition
- Transition mutation
- Translation
- Translocase (EF-G)
- Translocation
- Transposable element
- Transposition
- Transposon
- Transversion
- Triplet
- Triplet code
- Triploid
- Trisomic
- Trisomy
- Tritium
- tRNA
- Trp
- Truncation selection
- Tumour virus
- Turner syndrome
- Twin study
- Type I and type II errors
- Tyr

== U ==
- Uncharacterized LOC644249 gene
- Underdominance
- Unequal crossover
- Uniparental disomy
- Upstream and downstream (DNA)
- Uptake signal sequence
- Uracil
- Uridine

== V ==
- V-J joining
- Val
- Variable region
- Variance
- Variate
- Variegation
- Vector
- Viability
- Virion
- Viroid
- Virus
- VNTR

== W ==
- Wahlund effect
- Weismann barrier
- Western blot
- Wild type
- Wilms' tumor
- Wobble
- Wolfram syndrome

== X ==
- X chromosome
- X hyperactivation
- X linkage
- X linked
- X-and-Y linkage
- X-inactivation
- X:A ratio
- Xenograft
- XYY
- XYY syndrome

== Y ==
- Y chromosome
- Y linkage
- Y linked
- Y-chromosomal Aaron
- Y-chromosomal Adam
- YAC
- Y-chromosome haplogroups in populations of the world

== Z ==
- Z-DNA
- Zinc finger
- Zinc-finger protein
- Zygote

== See also ==
- List of genetics research organizations
- List of geneticists & biochemists
