= Composite transposon =

A composite transposon is similar in function to simple transposons and insertion sequence (IS) elements in that it has protein coding DNA segments flanked by inverted, repeated sequences that can be recognized by transposase enzymes. A composite transposon, however, is flanked by two separate IS elements which may or may not be exact replicas. Instead of each IS element moving separately, the entire length of DNA spanning from one IS element to the other is transposed as one complete unit. Composite transposons will also often carry one or more genes conferring antibiotic resistance.

== Flanked by SINEs in mammalian genomes ==
Two SINEs may act in concert to flank and mobilize an intervening single copy DNA sequence. This was reported for a 710 bp DNA sequence upstream of the bovine beta globin gene. The DNA arrangement forms a composite transposon whose presence has been confirmed by the complete bovine genomic sequence where the mobilized sequence may be found on bovine chromosome 15 in contig NW_001493315.1 nucleotides #1085432–1086142 and the originating sequence may be found on bovine chromosome 2 in contig NW_001501789.2 nucleotides #1096679–1097389. It is likely that similar composite transposons exist in other bovine genomic regions and other mammalian genomes. They could be detected with suitable algorithms.

== See also ==
- Tn10
