= Exogenote =

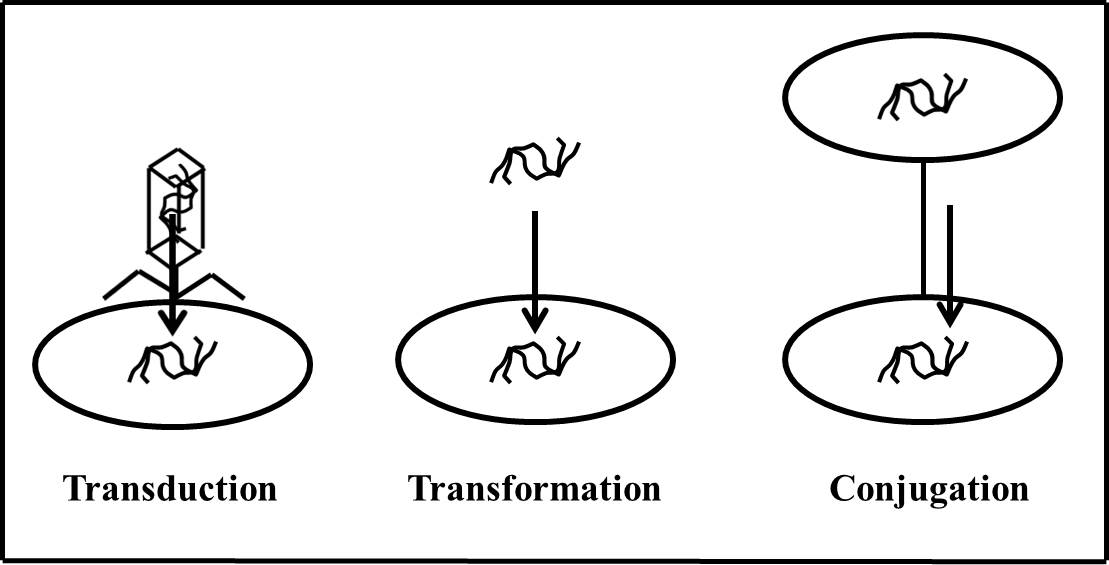

An exogenote is a piece of DNA introduced into a recipient cell from an external organism, utilized in the reproduction of prokaryotes. Exogenotes are homologous to an endogenote, which is the recipient cell's own chromosome, and form a merozygote upon the completion of reproduction. To reproduce asexually, prokaryotic organisms release genetic material into their environment, either by lysis, direct contact, or a nonlethal virus, and then utilized by various methods of horizontal gene transfer. This exogenous genetic material is then taken up by the recipient cell and integrated into the genome.

== History ==
Exogenotes were first discovered in a 1928 study by bacteriologist Fredrick Griffith, who observed the ability for bacterial reproduction despite cell death in the species Streptococcus pneumoniae. Later research in 1944 by physician Oswald Avery and geneticists Colin Munro MacLeod and Maclyn McCarty discovered that the transformative factor responsible for this reproduction was DNA that had originated from outside of the receiving cell. The idea of merozygotes and their components was proposed by William Hayes in the 1952, who claimed and proved that bacterial conjugation was not a mutual exchange, but rather a donation of DNA. This principle was further developed by Élie Wollman and François Jacob in 1956 to determine when donor genes manifested in recipient cells.

== Applications ==
=== Bacterial Transformation ===

The exogenote used in Bacterial Transformation, chromosomal fragments, are incorporated by being taken up into competent bacteria. These fragments, typically from dead bacterium that have lysed, are passed through the cell wall and plasma membrane via DNA-binding complexes into the recipient cell, where one strand of the DNA is degraded by nucleases and the other passes through. This exogenote binds to the homologous area of the recipient's DNA, permanently changing the genotype to match the exogenote. If the DNA taken up and is heterologous, the exogenote is degraded.

=== Bacterial Conjugation ===
In Bacterial Conjugation, the exogenote is an F plasmid which is replicated and directly transferred to the recipient cell by a conjugal bridge. Cells carrying the F plasmid (F^{+} cells) attach to the recipient cell (F^{-} cells) via cell surface tubules, or pili, allowing for cell-to-cell contact necessary for conjugation. The exogenote is then nicked, forming linear DNA that is then passed through the conjugal bridge into the F^{-} cell. This DNA strand is replicated in the donor cell, meaning that both bacteria involved in the process end with the same DNA.

=== Bacterial Transduction ===
The exogenote in transduction is carried by bacteriophages when genetic material from a prior host is repackaged into a new phage for reproduction. When this particle attaches to a new recipient bacterium, the injected DNA now carries the prior hosts DNA in addition to the viral DNA. If this DNA is closely related to the recipient DNA, it is accepted and integrated into the endogenote genome. Otherwise, the exogenote is degraded. This can either manifest in generalized or specialized transduction, which can affect the frequency of the transduction.

== See also ==
- Exogenous DNA
- Horizontal Gene Transfer
- Transformation
- Transduction
- Conjugation
- Plasmid
