= Simple transposon =

A simple transposon also called "conservative transposon" is an insertion sequence (IS element) that contains its own coding transposase between the short, inverted, repeated sequences that flank (present) its gene coding region. Transposase is responsible for excision and transfer while resolvase is responsible for resolution of the transfer.

Simple transposition is also called cut-and-paste transposition because the element is cut out of its original site and pasted into a new one.
