= F cell =

F cell may refer to:

== Biology ==
- Pancreatic polypeptide cells, also called F cells or gamma (γ) cells, responsible for synthesizing pancreatic polypeptide from the pancreatic islets
- F-cells, adult red blood cells that contain fetal hemoglobin (HbF)
- F-plasmid, a factor allowing genes to be transferred from one bacterium (F^{+} cell) to another (F^{-} cell) via conjugation

== Vehicles ==
- Mercedes-Benz F-Cell, a hydrogen fuel cell electric vehicle
- Mercedes-Benz F-Cell Roadster, a concept car

== See also ==
- Fuel cell, an electrochemical cell that converts the chemical energy of a fuel and an oxidizing agent into electricity
