= Sxy 5′ UTR element =

sxy 5′ UTR element
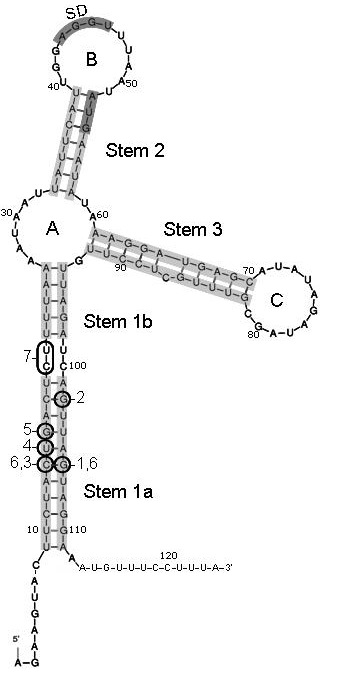
- Secondary structure of the sxy 5′-UTR regulatory element

Identifiers
- Symbol: sxy
- Rfam: RF00632

Other data
- RNA type: Cis-reg
- Domain: Haemophilus influenzae
- PDB structures: PDBe

The Sxy 5′ UTR element is an RNA element that controls expression of the sxy gene in H. influenzae. The sxy gene is a transcription factor (also known as TfoX) that regulates competence which is the ability of bacteria to take up DNA from their environment. When the sxy gene is deleted the bacterium loses the ability to express genes in the competence regulon. Cameron et al. recently showed that mutations in the 5′ end of the sxy gene lead to hypercompetence. They showed that this region formed an RNA secondary structure that occludes the Shine-Dalgarno sequence. Mutations that interfere with the stability of this secondary structure lead to increased translation of sxy followed by upregulation of the competence regulon.

== tfoR RNA ==
In the fellow gammaproteobacterium Vibrio cholerae, a different RNA regulatory system is used. Here, a sRNA named 'tfoR' positively regulates expression of the sxy (tfoX) protein.

The RNA element responds to chitin, which is an important regulator of competence in V. cholera. Deletion of tfoR removed all competence for exogenous DNA in V. cholera in vivo.

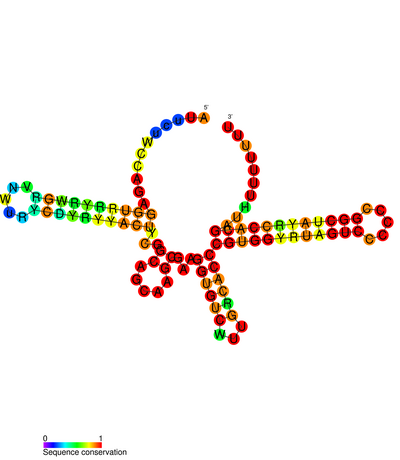
The predicted secondary structure of tfoR sRNA.
