= Bead theory =

Disproved genetic hypothesis

The bead theory is a disproved hypothesis that genes are arranged on the chromosome like beads on a necklace. According to this theory, the existence of a gene as a unit of inheritance is recognized through its mutant alleles. A mutant allele affects a single phenotypic character, maps to one chromosome locus, gives a mutant phenotype when paired, and shows a Mendelian ratio when intercrossed.

== History ==
This theory was first proposed by Thomas Hunt Morgan after discovering genes through his work with breeding red- and white-eyed fruit flies. Guido Pontecorvo continued to work under the basis of this theory until Seymour Benzer showed in the 1950s that the bead theory was not correct. He demonstrated that a gene can be defined as a unit of function. A gene can be subdivided into a linear array of sites that are mutable and that can be recombined. The smallest units of mutation and recombination are now known to be correlated with single nucleotide pairs.

== Postulates ==
Several tenets of the bead theory are worth emphasizing:

- The gene is viewed as a fundamental unit of structure, indivisible by crossing over. Crossing over takes place between genes (the beads in this model) but never within them.
- The gene is viewed as the fundamental unit of change or mutation. It changes in toto from one allelic form into another; there are no smaller components within it that can change.
- The gene is viewed as the fundamental unit of function (although the precise function of a gene is not specified in this model). Parts of a gene, if they exist cannot function.

== See also ==
- Emergence of molecular genetics

== Sources ==
- Benzer, S. (1956). "Genetic fine structure and its relation to the DNA molecule". Brookhaven Symp Biol (8): 3–5. PMID 13293416.
- Griffiths, A. J. F.; Wessler, S. R.; Lewontin, R. C.; Gelbart, W. M.; Suzuki, D. T.; Miller, J. H. (2000). An Introduction to Genetic Analysis (7th ed.). New York: W. H. Freeman and Company.
