= Chimeraplasty =

Non-viral method of gene therapy

Chimeraplasty is a non-viral method of gene therapy. Chimeraplasty changes DNA sequences using a synthetic strand of RNA and DNA. This strand of RNA and DNA is known as a chimeraplast. The chimeraplast enters a cell and attaches itself to the target gene. The DNA of the chimeraplast and the cell complement each other except in the middle of the strand, where the chimeraplast's sequence is different from that of the cell. The DNA repair enzymes then replace the cell's DNA with that of the chimeraplast. This leaves the chimeraplast's new sequence in the cell's DNA and the replaced DNA sequence then decays.

This technique was first developed and named by Eric Kmiec at Thomas Jefferson University. Since its discovery there has been debate over chimeraplasty's effectiveness. In the 6 September 1996 article of Science, Kmiec claimed that chimeraplasty was 50% effective in human cells. This figure was later disputed by a number of universities; chimeraplasty is now considered from .4-2.4% effective at transforming fibroblasts, and 0.0002% effective in transforming yeast cells.
