= DNA bank =

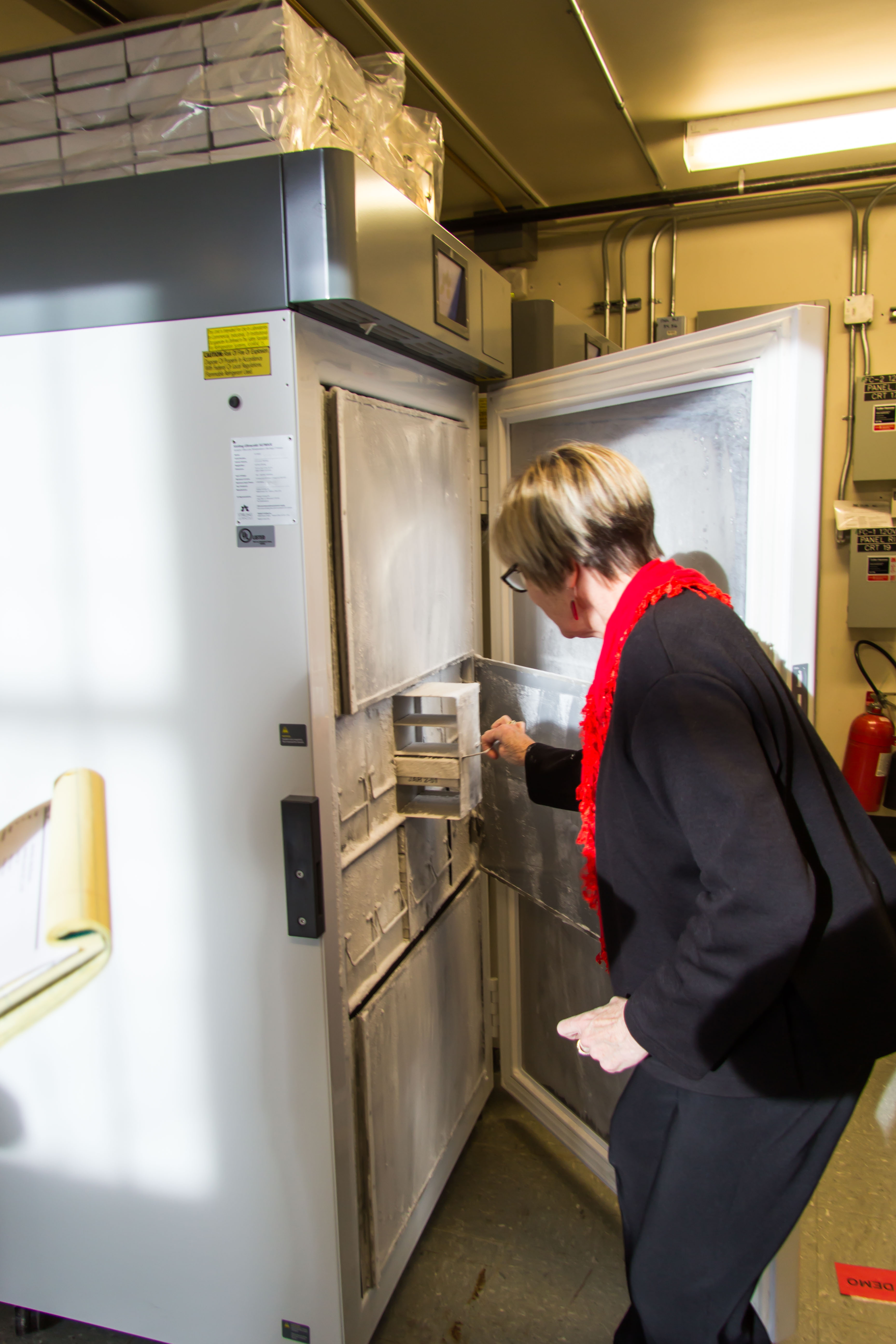
Burke Museum of Natural History and Culture executive director Julie K. Stein demonstrating a method of storing DNA in a -80 degree freezer

DNA banking is the secure, long-term storage of an individual's genetic material. DNA is most commonly extracted from blood, but can also be obtained from saliva and other tissues. DNA banks allow for conservation of genetic material and comparative analysis of an individual's genetic information. Analyzing an individual's DNA can allow scientists to predict genetic disorders, as used in preventive genetics or gene therapy, and prove that person's identity, as used in the criminal justice system. There are multiple methods for testing and analyzing genetic information including restriction fragment length polymorphism (RFLP) and polymerase chain reactions (PCR).

== Uses ==
DNA banking is used to conserve genetic material, especially that of organisms that face extinction. This is a more prominent issue today due to deforestation and climate change, which serve as a threat to biodiversity. The genetic information can be stored within lambda phage and plasma vectors. The National Institute of Agrobiological Sciences (NIAS) DNA Bank, for example, collects the DNA of agricultural organisms, such as rice and fish, for scientific research. Most DNA provided by DNA banks is used for studies to attempt to develop more productive or more environmentally friendly agricultural species. Some DNA banks also store the DNA of rare or endangered species to ensure their survival.

The DNA bank can be used to compare and analyze DNA samples. Comparison of DNA samples allowed scientists to work on the Human Genome Project, which maps out many of the genes on human DNA. It has also led to the development of preventive genetics. Samples from the DNA bank have been used to identify patterns and determine which genes lead to specific disorders. Once people know which genes lead to disorders, people can take steps to lessen the effects of that disorder. This can occur through adjustments in lifestyle, as demonstrated in preventive healthcare, or even through gene therapy. DNA can be banked at any time during a person's life.

DNA banks were introduced to the criminal justice system in the 1980s. This system makes it possible to rule out or confirm the verdict of a suspect based on their personal genetic code. Once an individual's DNA is stored, it remains in the system permanently; allowing law enforcement to identify and track criminals more easily. There is some controversy about this topic as some individuals believe the storage of citizen's DNA is an invasion of privacy.

DNA banking capsules are also starting to be used for retaining the DNA of the deceased, a service offered by some funeral homes.

== Processes ==
Scientists are capable of retrieving genetic information from hair, skin, blood, sperm, tissue, and saliva as long as the sample contains intact DNA. Nucleotide sequences between humans differ by only 0.1%. Even so, this 0.1% includes approximately three million bases. DNA can be analyzed through restriction fragment length polymorphism (RFLP) and Polymerase chain reactions (PCR). The RFLP process was introduced in 1988. Restriction enzymes digest portions of the DNA, leaving short fragments. These fragments are sorted through gel electrophoresis. The gel demonstrates the length of the fragments allowing specialists to determine whether the fragments came from the same person. PCR is more commonly used today because it more efficient and requires smaller samples of genetic samples.

== Organizations ==
There are various organizations founded for the purpose of storing and analyzing DNA sample. For example; The UK Biobank contains DNA samples of 500,000 individuals aged between 40 and 69 when their samples were taken in the years 2006-2010. The Human DNA Bank India at Lucknow city, the Asia's first Human DNA Bank takes the DNA of common public, stores it for 50 years, takes their biometrics as well and provide them a UID DNA card. This system is an absolute mean of identity and is helpful for the concerned associations in conditions such as identification at any mass gathering, identification at any massive calamity, identification at terrorist attacks, and identification of any individual even if they are hiding their real identity. The director Dr. Saeed Ahmad has established Asia's first human DNA bank in India and has been well known throughout the world for his work on DNA. Under IQRA Biotech Services, this human DNA bank, which is in public-private partnership with Biotech Park, Lucknow under the Department of Biotechnology and the Ministry of Science and Technology. IQRA Biotech Services has also established a cord blood and stem cell bank that stores the stem cells of their clients and in future it is possible that these stem cells may be used for genetic treatments of diseases like spinal cord injuries, neuralgic palsy, leukemia, Parkinson's disease, anemia, SCIA, and cancer.

== See also ==
- DNA database
