= Germ line theory =

Proposed explanation for immunoglobulin diversity

The germ-line theory was a proposed explanation for immunoglobulin diversity that attributed the variety of antibodies to a large number of inherited immunoglobulin genes. It held that the genetic information for this diversity was already present in the germ line and passed from parents to offspring. The competing somatic mutation theory proposed that diversity arose through mutations in a smaller number of inherited antibody genes.

Subsequent research showed that antibody diversity depends on both inherited gene segments and changes to DNA within B cells. In humans and mice, immunoglobulin genes are assembled from these segments through V(D)J recombination, and somatic hypermutation introduces further variation. In some elasmobranchs, certain immunoglobulin genes already contain joined variable-region gene segments in the germ line. Fully joined genes can encode antibody chains without further V(D)J recombination in B cells. Sharks also generate antibody diversity through somatic gene rearrangement and somatic mutation.

== Historical background ==
Clonal selection of B cells following antigen recognition. The theory explained the expansion of cells with a particular antibody specificity, but left open how the initial diversity of specificities arose.

Experiments showing that antibodies could recognize chemically modified proteins and synthetic compounds raised the question of how an organism could produce such a varied antibody repertoire. Clonal selection theory explained how an antigen could stimulate the multiplication of cells with a corresponding antibody specificity, but did not itself establish how those specificities arose.

Proponents of the germ-line theory argued that antibody genes had diversified during evolution through mutation and natural selection, with the resulting repertoire inherited by each generation. The competing somatic mutation theory placed the generation of diversity within the individual. The debate therefore concerned both the number of inherited antibody genes and when the genetic changes responsible for diversity occurred.

The discovery that antibodies contain separate heavy and light chains allowed germ-line models to account for more antibodies with fewer genes. In a model discussed by Leroy Hood and David Talmage in 1970, different combinations of inherited heavy and light chains could generate a repertoire much larger than the number of genes encoding those chains.

== Experimental evidence ==
Schematic of an antibody showing the variable (V) and constant (C) domains of its heavy (H) and light (L) chains. The paired variable domains form an antigen-binding site (circled).

In 1965, William Dreyer and J. Claude Bennett proposed that separate inherited DNA sequences encoded the variable and constant regions of an immunoglobulin chain and were brought together in antibody-producing cells. Their model combined inherited variable-region diversity with a change in gene organization during cell development.

In 1976, Nobumichi Hozumi and Susumu Tonegawa compared DNA from mouse embryos with DNA from an antibody-producing plasma-cell tumour. After cutting the DNA with a restriction enzyme, they found that sequences encoding the variable and constant regions of an immunoglobulin light chain occurred on separate fragments in embryonic DNA but on the same fragment in tumour DNA. This provided evidence that immunoglobulin genes undergo somatic rearrangement.

In 1978, Ora Bernard, Hozumi and Tonegawa compared the sequences of embryonic and rearranged mouse immunoglobulin light-chain genes. They showed that variable (V) and joining (J) segments were joined in the antibody-producing cells and identified nucleotide substitutions in the variable-region sequence, providing evidence for both somatic recombination and mutation.

The resulting explanation incorporated elements of both competing theories: multiple inherited gene segments contribute to the antibody repertoire, while somatic recombination and mutation generate additional diversity.
