= Mercedes-Benz F-Cell Roadster =

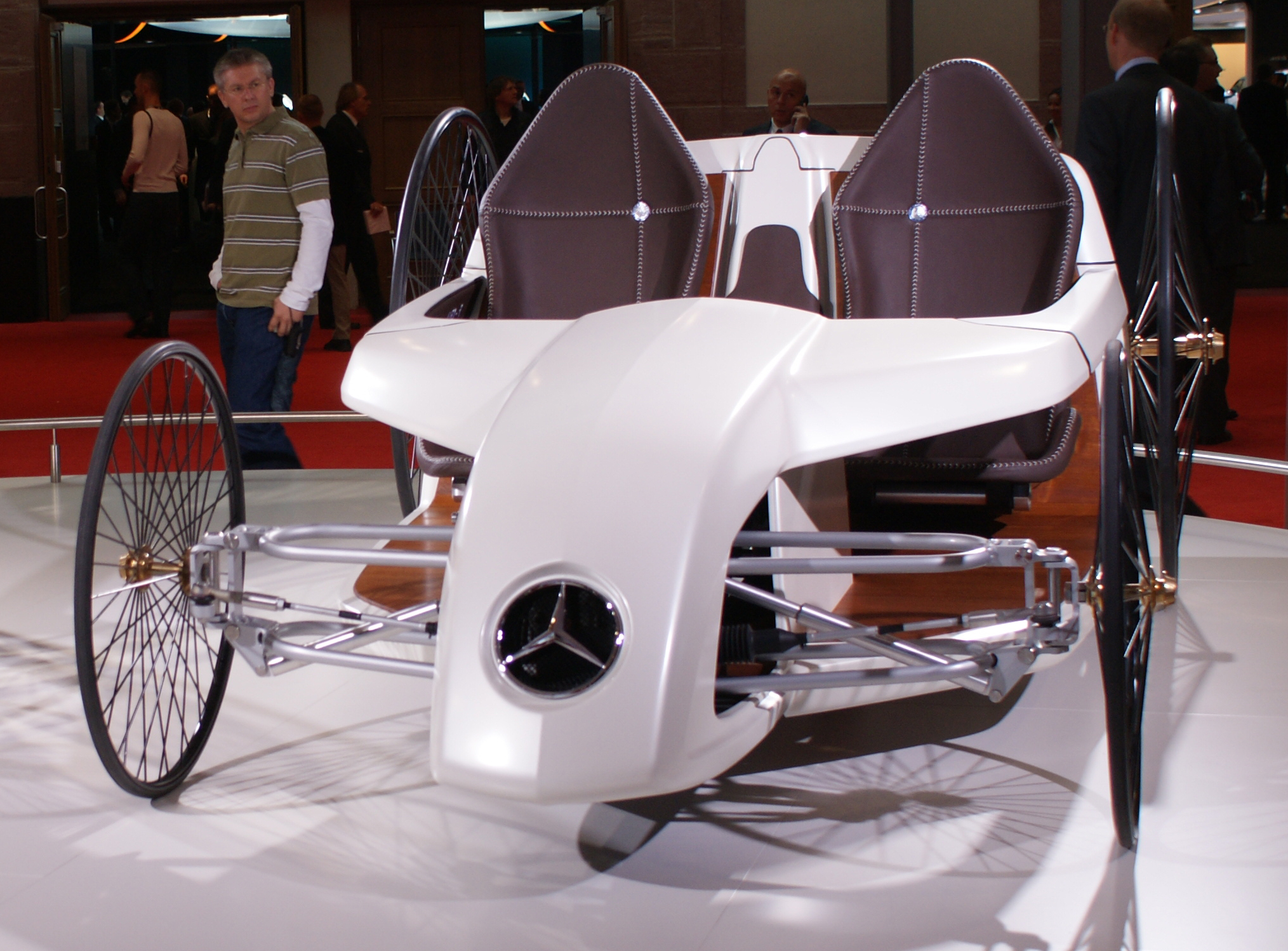

The Mercedes-Benz F-Cell Roadster is a concept car produced in 2009 by the German car company Mercedes-Benz. During April 2009, the concept car traveled the Bertha Benz Memorial Route thus celebrating the exploits of Mrs. Bertha Benz in 1888.

It has an electric motor powered by a fuel cell located at the rear with a power of 1.2 kW (1.6 hp). It has a low top speed of 25 km/h (16 mph) and can achieve an operating range of 350 km (217 mi). Inside the vehicle are a joystick replacing the conventional wheel, and bucket seats in carbon fiber. The design is meant to resemble a horseless carriage and references the original Benz Patent-Motorwagen with large diameter and thin spoked wheels.

== See also ==
- Hydrogen vehicle
