= Polar mutation =

A polar mutation affects expression of downstream genes or operons. It can also affect the expression of the gene in which it occurs, if it occurs in a transcribed region. These mutations tend to occur early within the sequence of genes and can be nonsense, frameshift, or insertion mutations. Polar mutations are found only in organisms containing polycistronic mRNA.
