= Insertion sequence =

Kind of transposon

Insertion element (also known as an IS, an insertion sequence element, or an IS element) is a short DNA sequence that acts as a simple transposable element. Insertion sequences have two major characteristics: they are small relative to other transposable elements (generally around 700 to 2500 bp in length) and only code for proteins implicated in the transposition activity (they are thus different from other transposons, which also carry accessory genes such as antibiotic resistance genes).

A particular insertion sequence may be named according to the form ISn, where n is a number (e.g. IS1, IS2, IS3, IS10, IS50, IS911, IS26 etc.); this is not the only naming scheme used, however.

== Composition ==
These proteins are usually the transposase which catalyses the enzymatic reaction allowing the IS to move, and also one regulatory protein which either stimulates or inhibits the transposition activity. The coding region in an insertion sequence is usually flanked by inverted repeats. For example, the well-known IS911 (1250 bp) is flanked by two 36bp inverted repeat extremities and the coding region has two genes partially overlapping orfA and orfAB, coding the transposase (OrfAB) and a regulatory protein (OrfA).

Diagram illustrating the role of insertion sequences ("IS") in a composite transposon

In addition to occurring autonomously, insertion sequences may also occur as parts of composite transposons. In a composite transposon, two insertion sequences flank one or more accessory genes, such as an antibiotic resistance gene (e.g. Tn10, Tn5). Nevertheless, there exist another sort of transposons, called unit transposons, that do not carry insertion sequences at their extremities (e.g. Tn7).

A complex transposon does not rely on flanking insertion sequences for resolvase. The resolvase is part of the tns genome and cuts at flanking inverted repeats.

== Evolutionary role ==
Although insertion sequences are usually discussed in the context of prokaryotic genomes, certain eukaryotic DNA sequences belonging to the family of Tc1/mariner transposable elements may be considered to be insertion sequences.

Transposition frequency of IS elements is dependent of multiple parameters, including culture growth phase, medium composition, oxygen tension, growth scale, and structural conformation of target sites (e.g.: curvature, presence of certain motifs, DNA composition). Recombination between genomic IS sites can enable bacteria to adapt to new environments, making IS elements an important mechanism for evolution in bacteria.

== See also ==
- Mobile genetic elements
