= X hyperactivation =

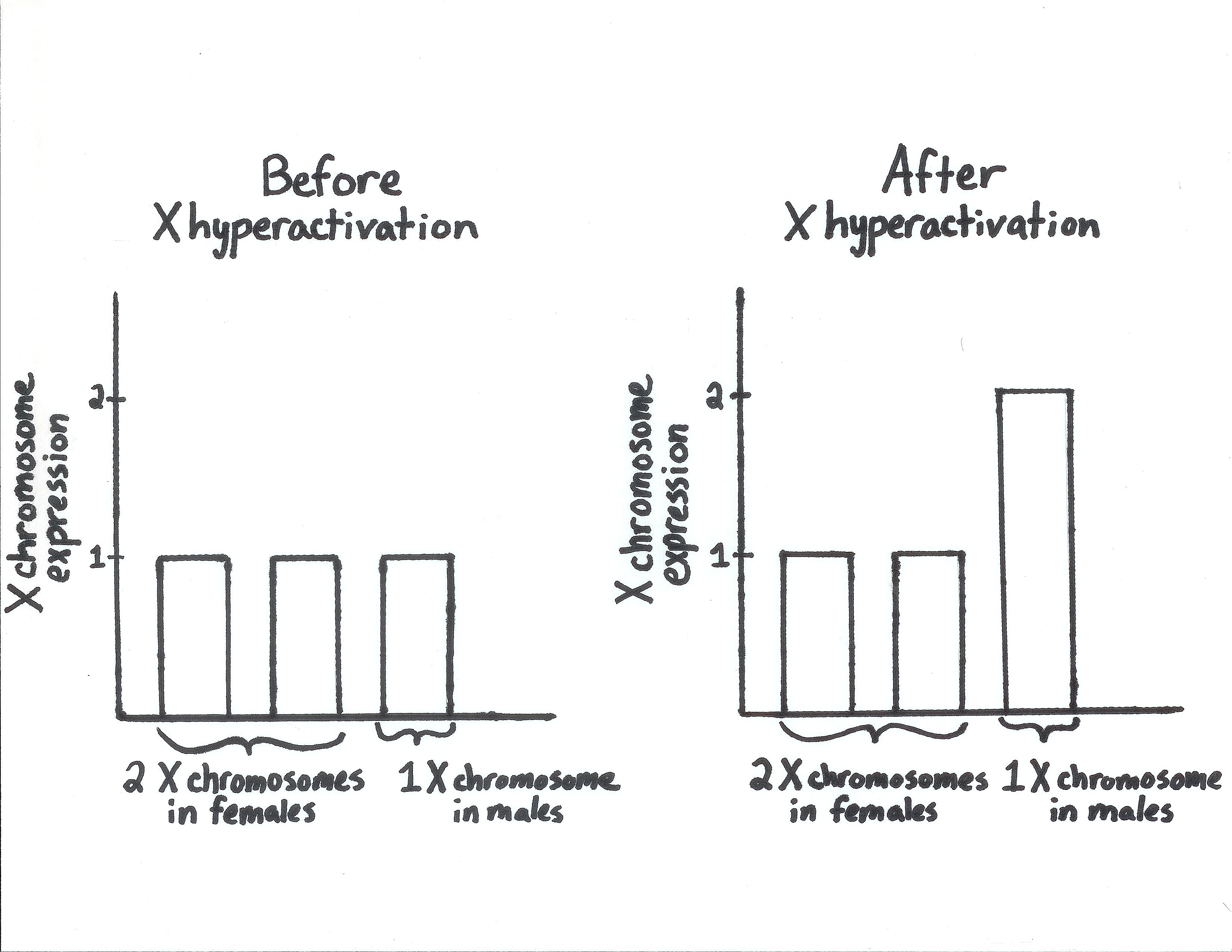
X hyperactivation in male Drosophila compensates for having a single X chromosome. Before the X is hyperactivated (left panel), the single X chromosome in males results in only half as much overall gene expression as the two X chromosomes in females. After X hyperactivation (right panel), the X chromosome expression is doubled in males, resulting in an equivalent gene dosage to the two X chromosomes in females.

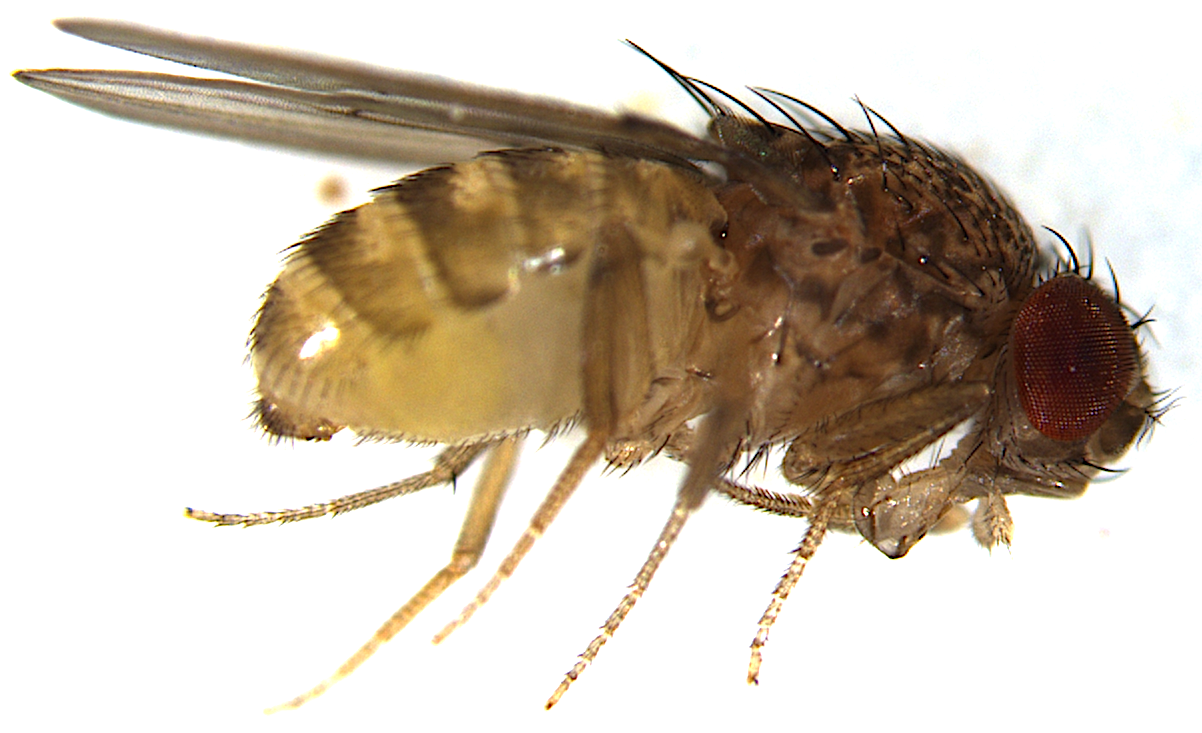
Lateral view of a male Drosophila.

X hyperactivation refers to the process in Drosophila by which genes on the X chromosome in male flies become twice as active as genes on the X chromosome in female flies.

In Drosophila, there is a stark difference between the X and Y chromosome as most genetic material has been lost on the Y chromosome. Due to this, Drosophila relies on the genetic material of the X chromosome. Because male flies have a single X chromosome and female flies have two X chromosomes, the higher level of activation in males ensures that X chromosome genes are overall expressed at the same level as females. X hyperactivation is one mechanism of dosage compensation, where organisms that use genetic sex determination systems balance the sex chromosome gene dosage between males and females. X hyperactivation is regulated by the alternative splicing of a gene called sex-lethal. The gene was named sex-lethal due to its mutant phenotype which has little to no effect on males but results in the death of females due to X hyperactivation of the two X chromosomes.

In female Drosophila, the sex-lethal protein causes the female-specific splicing of the sex-lethal gene to produce more of the sex-lethal protein. This produces a positive feedback loop. In male Drosophila, there isn’t enough sex-lethal proteins to activate the female-specific splicing of the sex-lethal gene, and it goes through the "default" splicing. This means the section of the gene that is spliced out in females remains in males. This remaining portion contains an early stop codon resulting in no sex-lethal protein being made. In females, the sex-lethal protein inhibits the male-specific lethal (msl) gene complex that would normally activate X-linked genes, increasing the male transcription rate. The msl gene complex was named due to the loss-of-function mutant that results in the improper increase in the male transcription rate that results in the death of males. In males, the absence of the necessary amount of sex-lethal allows for the increase in the male transcription rate due to the msl gene complex no longer being inhibited. This allows the expression of the X chromosome to be "doubled," or hyperactivated, to match females' two X chromosomes.

Up-regulation of the X chromosome has also been recorded in many mammals despite being most well known in Drosophilia.

The second dosage compensation that occurs in mammals are the balancing of X’s and autosomes. This regulation occurs by the upregulation of Xa, which is the active X. The upregulation of the active X shows increases in the activation of transcription and elongation. The X chromosome, compared to an autosomal gene, contains more silent genes that control the amount of influence active genes have. RNA-seq data was preformed and the autosomal and X linked gene outputs were significantly different. This agrees with the fact that X dosage compensation is in respect to autosomes. The loss of an X chromosome leads to an aneuploidy effect which disrupts the entire cell in Drosophila. This effect leads to the disruption of MSL (male specific lethal) from binding onto its target site. To overcome this, the X chromosome is first hyperactivated. Then, the hyperactivated X chromosome facilitates the inversion of the aneuploidy effect to create a gene expression equality between males and females. Natural selection occurs efficiently in Drosophila so the genes that are dosage-sensitive are increased. The dosage-sensitive genes vary from species to species.
