= Copper fist =

Copper fist domain
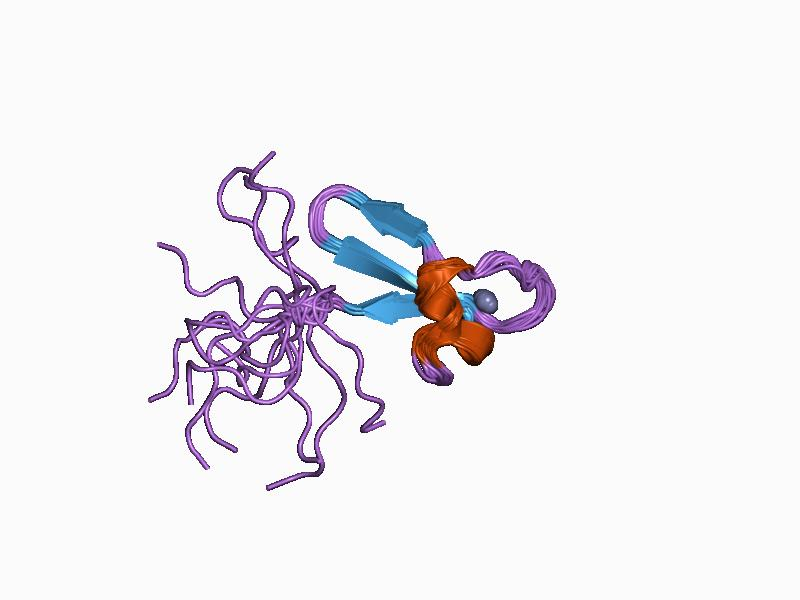
- Structure of a zinc domain conserved in yeast copper-regulated transcription factors.

Identifiers
- Symbol: Copper fist
- Pfam: PF00649
- InterPro: IPR001083
- SMART: SM00412
- PROSITE: PS50073
- SCOP2: 1co4 / SCOPe / SUPFAM
Available protein structures:
- PDB: 1co4 IPR001083 PF00649 (ECOD; PDBsum)
- AlphaFold: IPR001083; PF00649

Copper fist is an N-terminal domain involved in copper-dependent DNA binding. It is named for its resemblance to a fist closed around a penny. Functionally, the "penny" is a collection of copper ions and the "knuckles" of the fist are proteins that interact with the promoter of the metallothionein gene, enhancing its transcription by creating a more stable binding site for RNA polymerase during transcription, an essential step in DNA replication.

== Structure and function ==
The copper fist domain contains an array of zinc-binding polymers (Cys-X2-Cys-X8-Cys-X-His) that form a three-stranded antiparallel β-sheet, a secondary protein structure composed of beta strands connected by hydrogen bonds, with two short helical segments that protrude from the end of the β-sheet. One primary function of the copper fist domain is to maintain copper homeostasis. Copper is an essential trace element involved in various biological processes, including energy production, antioxidant defense, and the functioning of metalloenzymes; however, high levels of copper can be toxic to many organisms.

== Fungal transcription factors and metallothionein regulation ==
Another function of the copper fist domain is the activation and regulation of the metallothionein gene. Metallothionein, a type of protein that binds metal in cells, is responsible for maintaining metal-based homeostasis, protecting from heavy metal toxicity, and oxidative stress. The promoter of the metallothionein gene reacts with certain metals to achieve these properties. The copper fist domain can be found in some fungal transcription factors (MAC1, Cuf1, AfMac1, Afu2g01190, Afu6g07780, etc.).

The copper fist DNA binding domain of yeast and other fungi interacts with copper when it is encountered in excess, as high levels of copper can be very toxic to fungal cell walls and membranes. The proteins of the domain proteins activate, improve, and stabilize the transcription of the metallothionein gene in response to copper ions. The copper fist domain is similar in structure to metallothionein itself, and it undergoes a large conformational change upon binding to copper, which allows for the binding of DNA and the enhancement of the promoter region of the metallothionein gene.

ACE1 and AMT1 are examples of copper fist fungal transcription factors. ACE1 can activate metallothionein to prevent the toxicity caused by excess copper. AMT1 functions similarly in reducing potentially toxic copper levels. MAC1 is another copper sensitive gene that is essential for both copper mediation and copper usage in yeast.
