= Cointegrate =

A cointegrate is the intermediate molecule between donor DNA and target DNA covalently bind during the formation of a Holliday junction. Transposons elements are DNA sequences that can change its position within the genome, sometimes creating reversing mutations. A number of bacterial transposons, especially those related to Tn3 Tn552, encodes two recombinases that participate in their transposition to other DNA. The initial step that mediated this process involve the formation of cointegrate. The cointegrate is formed between the transposon containing donor DNA and the target molecule. In this transpositional intermediate, the donor and target DNAs are joined together by copies of the duplicated transposon, one copy occurring at each donor–target junction.
