= Hybrid plasmid =

Hybrid plasmid is a plasmid that contains an inserted piece of foreign DNA.
