= Bradytroph =

Organism exhibiting slow growth without a metabolite

A bradytroph is a strain of an organism that exhibits slow growth in the absence of an external source of a particular metabolite. This is usually due to a defect in an enzyme required in the metabolic pathway producing this chemical. Such defects are the result of mutations in the genes encoding these enzymes. As the organism can still produce small amounts of the chemical, the mutation is not lethal. In these bradytroph strains, rapid growth occurs when the chemical is present in the cell's growth media and the missing metabolite can be transported into the cell from the external environment. A bradytroph may also be referred to as a "leaky auxotroph".

The first usage of "bradytroph" was to describe Escherichia coli mutants partially defective in arginine biosynthesis. Among many other examples of bradytrophic strains of microorganisms are Bacillus subtilis strains with mutations affecting thiamine production and Saccharomyces cerevisiae strains with mutations that impair arginine biosynthesis.

== See also ==
- Autotroph
- Auxotrophy
