= Deletion mapping =

Genetic technique

Deletion mapping is a genetic technique used to determine the approximate location of a mutation within a gene or chromosome. It is based on recombination between a strain carrying an unknown point mutation and a series of strains carrying known deletions.

== Principle ==
In deletion mapping, an organism carrying a point mutation is crossed with multiple strains, each of which carries a deletion spanning a different region of the same gene.

If recombination produces wild-type offspring, the point mutation must lie outside the deleted region. A functional copy of the gene can then be reconstructed from the intact DNA contributed by the two parental strains.

If no wild-type recombinants are produced, the point mutation is inferred to lie within the deleted region. Because one parent lacks that region entirely, recombination cannot restore a complete wild-type sequence.

== Example ==
Schematic illustration of deletion mapping, showing how overlap between a point-mutation site and different deletion intervals determines whether wild-type recombinants can be recovered.

Consider a wild-type copy of gene A and a mutant allele carrying a point mutation at an unknown position. Two additional strains carry different deletions within the same gene, designated del-1 and del-2.

In the figure, the point mutation lies within the region deleted in del-1. Crossing the point mutant with the del-1 strain is therefore not expected to produce wild-type recombinants: the point-mutant chromosome carries a mutation at that position, while the corresponding sequence is absent from the deletion chromosome.

By contrast, the point mutation lies outside the region deleted in del-2. Recombination between the point-mutant and del-2 chromosomes can therefore produce a chromosome containing neither the point mutation nor the deletion. The recovery of wild-type recombinants indicates that the point mutation lies outside the del-2 deletion.

Not every recombination event between the point mutant and del-2 will restore the wild-type allele. Only crossovers occurring at suitable positions can reconstruct an intact wild-type sequence.
