= Uncharacterized LOC644249 gene =

Uncharacterized LOC644249 gene, also known as ankyrin repeat domain 18A pseudogene, or RP11-195B21.3, is about 1058 base pairs long and is found in Homo sapiens on chromosome 9q12. More specifically, the sequence is located on Chromosome: 9; NC_000009.11(67977457..67987991 bp). This pseudogene has a domain of unknown function DUF3496 which is about 110 amino acids long, functionally uncharacterized, and found in eukaryotes.

== Gene ==
=== Genomic Location ===
For humans, this gene is located on chromosome 9q12 (67977457..67987991) bp.

The genomic location of LOC644249.

=== Promoter ===
The promoter is predicted to be about 601 bp in length and is about 100 bp upstream from the transcription start site of the primary transcript .

=== Transcript ===
Transcript prediction of LOC644249.

This gene is predicted to have 4 exons, with a very small 3'UTR which is capped with a poly A tail very shortly after the 4th exon.

== Protein ==
The protein product is the coiled-coil domain-containing protein 29, abbreviated CCDC29, is about 291 amino acids in length and contains the DUF3496 motif. Also, this protein is also predicted to have a possible transmembrane site at about 284 - 291 aa.

- Isoelectric Point:6.043
- Molecular Weight 33.6 kdal

=== Charge Distribution Analysis ===
      1  0000000000 0--0-000-0 +0-00+0-00 0++0+0+0-- 000-+-0000 +00000+-00
     61  0000-0000+ +00000-+0- --++00+--0 000+000-00 +0-00+00-0 +0-0--+000
    121  00-+0--000 0-0000-+00 -000+-0000 00++-000+- 0-0+00-0+0 00–000-0-
    181  -0+-000000 +000000++0 0+00++0000 00+000-+-0 0+00000000 ++-0-0000-
    241  00000000++ 0000000+00 0000000000 +000000000 0000000000 0[5]

=== Motif ===
The DUF3496 motif is about 110 aa long and is conserved within eukaryotes. As the name implies, it is currently unknown in function but can be found across different species. On CCDC 29, its relative location is about 153 - 259 aa.

=== Expression ===
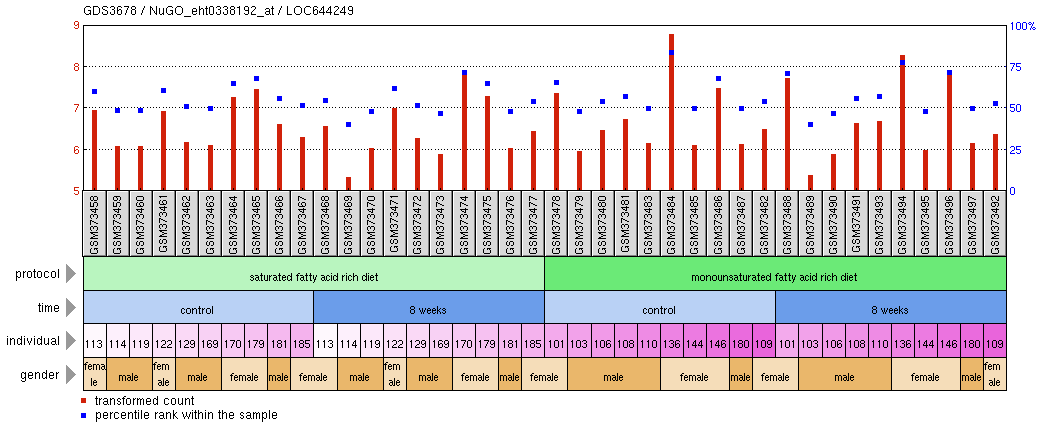
The GEO profile of LOC644249 on adipose tissue.

This GEO profile of LOC644249 was included in a gene expression profile which was conducted in a study that analyzed adipose tissues of subjects at risk of metabolic syndrome. This GEO profile may suggest that LOC644249 is ubiquitously expressed in adipose tissue but no direct correlation of the effects of the expression levels of LOC644249 with adipose tissue can be made.

=== Transcript Variant ===
Only two transcript variants were predicted to might occur. One transcript variant predicted the loss of exon 4. The loss of exon 4 would lead to the loss of roughly half of the DUF3496 and the entire loss of the transmembrane domain. The other transcript variant predicted the loss of exon 2, which would not lead to the loss of DUF3496 and leaves the reading frame relatively intact.

== Homology ==
Orthologs of CCDC29 seem to be only limited to primates as shown by the table below. A paralog of CCDC29 which is not only limited to primates, Ankyrin repeat domain-containing protein 26, showed that this paralog is reserved within vertebrate animals only. The most distant ortholog of Ankyrin repeat domain-containing protein 26 was found to be the gallus gallus species.

Scientific name	Common name	Accession number	Sequence length (aa)	Percent identity	Percent Similarity
Homo sapiens	Human	XP_003960494.1	291	-	-
Gorilla gorilla	Gorilla	XP_004062636.1	223	86%	94%
Sus scrofa	chimpanzee	XP_003954217.1	290	89%	97%
Nomascus leucogenys	Northern White-cheeked Gibbon	XP_004087823.1	273	89%	97%

== Protein Post-Modification ==
=== N glycosylation ===
The predicted sites of N-glycosylation.

One possible N-glycosylation site was predicted, but a signal peptide was not detected. Thus, it is possible that CCDC29 does not undergo this particular modification even though it has the possible site.

=== Phosphorylation ===
The predicted sites of Phosphrylation.

A total of 13 likely phosphorylation sites were predicted: Ser: 5 Thr: 6 Tyr: 2

The main concentration of the phosphorylation sites seem to be localized within the DUF3496 motif and the 3' end of the protein.

== Protein structure ==
The CCDC29, as the name implies, is thought to have the coiled coil motif. Protein structure prediction software confirms this motif 97.6% confidence.

=== Transmembrane ===
The predicted transmembrane site on CCDC29.

CCDC29 is predicted to have one transmembrane helix located at the N terminal 270.

=== Function ===
Currently unknown as of 5/9/2013.
