= Rare-cutter enzyme =

A rare-cutter enzyme is a type of restriction enzyme that has a long or uncommon recognition sequence. Since these sequences don't appear often in genomes, the enzyme cleaves DNA at a few locations, resulting in large DNA fragments. This characteristic of rare-cutter enzymes makes them useful in analyzing large genome sequences, such as in applications like genome mapping and cloning of large DNA segments.

== Classification and Characteristics ==
Rare-cutter enzyme is a type II restriction enzyme that recognizes a specific DNA sequence and cuts within or near the recognition site. They are generally a endonuclease that cleaves DNA at internal sites.

Rare-cutter enzymes recognition sequence typically contains seven or eight base pairs. The probability of nucleotides occurring in the same specific order is very low, as each position in the DNA sequence could be occupied by any of the four nucleotides. Thus, the length of the recognition sequence is inversely related to the probability of the DNA sequence occurring in the genome. As a result, large DNA fragments are generated as the recognition sites are apart in the genome.

== Applications ==
- Genome mapping: Common restriction enzymes with short recognition sequences produce many small DNA fragments that can be difficult to separate and identify. In contrast, the larger DNA fragments from the rare-cutter enzymes are easier to analyze and assemble into genome maps.
- Cloning large DNA fragments: The large DNA fragments produced by rare-cutter enzymes can be inserted into specialized vectors that will replicate the DNA fragments as the host cell divides.

== Examples ==
- NotI contains an eight base pair recognition sequence that cleaves after the first GC of a 5'-GCGGCCGC-3' sequence.
- SacII contains a six base pair recognition sequence that cleaves between the central CG on a 5'-CCGCGG-3' sequence and after GG in the corresponding 3'-GGCGCC-5' sequence.
