= Pseudodominance =

Pseudodominance is the situation in which the inheritance of a recessive trait mimics a dominant pattern.

Normally, two recessive alleles need to be inherited (one from each parent) for the recessive trait to be expressed but recessive merely means that the trait is only expressed in the absence of the dominant alleles. The pattern of inheritance in which a single recessive allele is inherited but is still expressed is known as pseudodominance. This mainly occurs with sex-linked genes (i.e., those on the sex chromosomes). The homogametic sex (females in humans) receive two of each sex chromosome and therefore need to be homozygous to show a recessive trait. The heterogametic sex (males in humans) only receives one of each sex chromosome and will therefore show recessive trait even if they have only inherited one copy of a recessive allele.

Haemophilia and red-green colour blindness are recessive, X-linked, pseudodominant genetic disorders, expressed mainly in human males because human females need to be homozygous (i.e., to have inherited the recessive allele from both parents) to show these traits.

Pseudodominance is also observed in some autosomal recessive conditions. This could happen in the cases of loss of the dominant allele (deletion) or of a deficiency mutation in the dominant allele in one homologue. The heterozygous condition is therefore lost at that particular locus. The individual becomes homozygous and the recessive phenotype is revealed. In a study on ectrodactyly with aplasia of long bones syndrome involving eight-generation consanguineous family in the United Arab Emirates in 2006, the condition was observed in 23 out of 145 individuals. There were 10 consanguineous marriages in the pedigree, and this suggests possible pseudodominace in the family due to high frequency of the mutant allele.

Imprinting, where one chromosome is 'switched off', can also produce pseudodominant patterns of inheritance.

== See also ==
- Central dogma of molecular biology
