= Morbid map =

In genetics, a morbid map is a chart or diagram of diseases and the chromosomal location of genes the diseases are associated with. A morbid map exists as an appendix of the Online Mendelian Inheritance in Man (OMIM) knowledgebase, listing chromosomes and the genes mapped to specific sites on those chromosomes, and this format most clearly reveals the relationship between gene and phenotype.
