= Merozygote =

In cell biology, a merozygote is a cell, usually bacterial, that is temporarily partial diploid as the result of DNA transfer processes like conjugation.

One example of how merozygotes can be formed is the transfer of genetic material of an Hfr cell to an F^{−} cell (in other words a bacterium without the F-factor) through conjugation. When an Hfr cell mates with an F^{−} cell, the chromosome acts as a rolling circle transferring a part of its genomic chromosome across a conjugation bridge. The origin is the first bit of the DNA to be injected, while the F-factor is the last. Very rarely the whole portion of the DNA (from the origin through the F-factor) will be transferred, resulting in a very low chance of passing on the F-factor to the F^{−} cell. After conjugation, the F^{−} cell will contain a part of the Hfr chromosome, the exogenote, as well as its own genomic chromosome, the endogenote. At this stage the cell is called a merozygote. This temporary partial diploid state may lead to recombination between the corresponding portions of the DNA, so that the genetic material of the donor may be incorporated into the chromosome of the recipient, thereby altering the genotype of the recipient. However, if no recombination occurs, the linear fragment of donor DNA in the recipient cytoplasm will be lost after one cycle. These merozygotes are useful in the study of dominance variation.
