= Three-point cross =

In genetics, a three-point cross is used to determine the loci of three genes in an organism's genome.

An individual heterozygous for three mutations is crossed with a homozygous recessive individual, and the phenotypes of the progeny are scored. The two most common phenotypes that result are the parental gametes; the two least common phenotypes that result come from a double crossover in gamete formation. By comparing the parental and double-crossover phenotypes, the geneticist can determine which gene is located between the others on the chromosome.

The recombinant frequency is the ratio of non-parental phenotypes to total individuals. It is expressed as a percentage, which is equivalent to the number of map units (or centiMorgans) between two genes. For example, if 100 out of 1000 individuals display the phenotype resulting from a crossover between genes a and b, then the recombination frequency is 10 percent and genes a and b are 10 map-units apart on the chromosome.

If the recombination frequency is greater than 50 percent, it means that the genes are unlinked - they are either located on different chromosomes or are sufficiently distant from each other on the same chromosome. Any recombination frequency greater than 50 percent is expressed as exactly 50 percent because, being unlinked, they are equally as likely as not to be separated during gamete formation.
