= Cytohet =

Biological Eukaryotic Cell

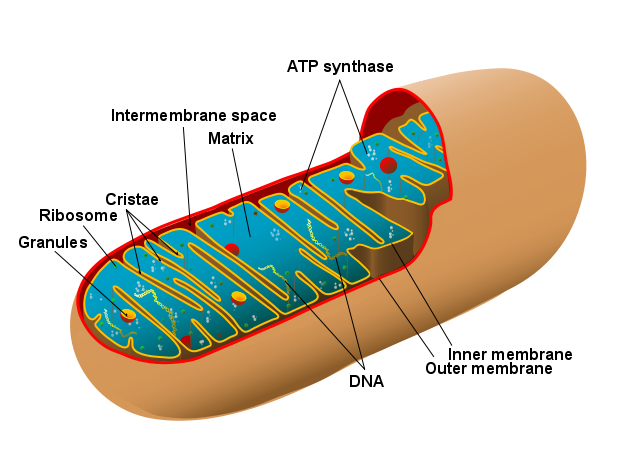
Diagram of a human mitochondrion

In genetics, a cytohet (or heteroplasmon) is a eukaryotic cell whose non-nuclear genome is heterozygous.

The non-nucleic genome of eukaryotic cells exists in cytoplasmic organelles, namely the chloroplasts (only in plant cells) and the mitochondria (in all eukaryotic cells).

Most of the genes in the mitochondria code for respiration-related proteins, and most of the genes in the chloroplasts code for photosynthesis-related proteins. The cytoplasmic genome, in contrast with the nucleic genome, exists in many copies in each cell: each cell contains numerous mitochondria and/or chloroplasts, and each such organelle contains multiple copies of its chromosome.

Mutations in the cytoplasmic genome occur spontaneously and at a much higher rate than in the nucleus, since the mitochondria and chloroplasts are exposed to high concentrations of reactive oxygen species (ROS, by-products of respiration and photosynthesis). Mitochondria and chloroplasts with mutant genes have the ability to cause wildtype alleles in other mitochondria and chloroplasts to become mutant as well; the way in which this is done is still not clear. A certain cell in which a mutant gene exists only in some of the organelles, whereas the wildtype allele exists in the rest, is a cytohet (or heteroplasmon).
