= Tn10 =

Tn10 is a transposable element, which is a sequence of DNA that is capable of mediating its own movement from one position in the DNA of the host organism to another. There are a number of different transposition mechanisms in nature, but Tn10 uses the non-replicative cut-and-paste mechanism. The transposase protein recognizes the ends of the element and cuts it from the original locus. The protein-DNA complex then diffuses away from the donor site until random collisions brings it in contact with a new target site, where it is integrated. To accomplish this reaction the 50 kDa transposase protein must break four DNA strands to free the transposon from the donor site, and perform two strand exchange reactions to integrate the element at the target site. This leaves two strands unjoined at the target site, but the host DNA repair proteins take care of this. The target site selection is essentially random, but there is a preference for the sequence 5'-GCTNAGC-3'. The 6-9 base pairs that flank the sequence also influence selection of the insertion site.

Cut-and-paste transposition does not cause an increase in the number of transposons per se: there is one copy at the start and one copy at the end. If this was the end of the matter the transposon would perish by genetic drift and the loss of copies owing to the occasional failure to achieve successful integration at the target site. However, the transposon has a mechanism to favor transposition immediately after a replication fork passes through, leaving a hemimethylated copy of Tn10 on each sister chromosome. Since transposition is favored when Tn10 is hemimethylated, the transposon on one sister chromosome can hop somewhere onto the other chromosome so that two copies of the transposon end up on one chromosome.

Tn10 has a composite structure and it is composed of a pair of insertion sequence elements (IS10) flanking five genes. Only one of the IS10 elements encodes a functional transposase. Since the ends of the IS10 element contain the transposase recognition sites, Tn10 has a total of four such sites. If the transposase binds the two recognition sites flanking an IS10 element, the IS10 element undergoes transposition independently of the larger composite structure. If the transposase binds the two outermost recognition sites, the whole composite Tn10 structure undergoes transposition.

Two of the five genes encoded by the central portion of Tn10, tetA and tetR, confer resistance to the antibiotic tetracycline. This activity of tetR forms the basis of the TetOFF assembly, a widely used construct in synthetic gene studies. The TetA protein is an efflux pump. It has served as a model system for such proteins and has accumulated hundreds of publications indexed in PubMed. The functions of the other three genes, jemA, jemB and jemC, are unknown but they may implicated in heavy metal resistance or oxidative stress.

The Tn10/IS10 transposase is closely related to another composite transposon, Tn5/IS50, which harbors a gene for kanamycin resistance in the unique (i.e. non-repeated) central region of the transposon.

The Tn10 transposon is often used in genetics to transfer and select-for genes of interest from one organism into the chromosome of another.

The mechanism of Tn10 transposition has served as a model system and the archetype for the cut-and-paste mechanisms. However, the transposase is difficult to work with in vitro and the Tn5 transposase was the first to be crystallized. Tn10 was one of the great work-horses of bacterial genetics for many years during which it served as a useful tool. A commercial kit for Tn5 transposition is commercially available and is extensively used in post-genomic technologies.
