= Natural competence =

Ability of cells to take up extracellular DNA

Natural competence. 1-Bacterial cell DNA 2-Bacterial cell plasmids 3-Sex pili 4-Plasmid of foreign DNA from a dead cell 5-Bacterial cell restriction enzyme 6-Unwound foreign plasmid 7-DNA ligase I: A plasmid of foreign DNA from a dead cell is intercepted by the sex pili of a naturally competent bacterial cell. II: The foreign plasmid is transduced through the sex pili into the bacterial cell, where it is processed by bacterial cell restriction enzymes. The restriction enzymes break the foreign plasmid into a strand of nucleotides that can be added to the bacterial DNA. III: DNA ligase integrates the foreign nucleotides into the bacterial cell DNA. IV: Recombination is complete and the foreign DNA has integrated into the original bacterial cell's DNA and will continue to be a part of it when the bacterial cell replicates next.

In microbiology, genetics, cell biology, and molecular biology, competence is the ability of a cell to alter its genetics by taking up extracellular DNA from its environment through a process called transformation. Competence can be differentiated between natural competence and induced or artificial competence. Natural competence is a genetically specified ability of bacteria that occurs under natural conditions as well as in the laboratory. Artificial competence arises when cells in laboratory cultures are treated to make them transiently permeable to DNA. Competence allows for rapid adaptation and DNA repair of the cell.

== History ==
Natural competence was discovered by Frederick Griffith in 1928, when he showed that a preparation of killed cells of a pathogenic bacterium contained something that could transform related non-pathogenic cells into the pathogenic type. In 1944 Oswald Avery, Colin MacLeod, and Maclyn McCarty demonstrated that this 'transforming factor' was pure DNA. This was the first compelling evidence that DNA carries the genetic information of the cell.

Since then, natural competence has been studied in a number of different bacteria, particularly Bacillus subtilis, Streptococcus pneumoniae, Neisseria gonorrhoeae, Haemophilus influenzae and members of the Acinetobacter genus. Areas of active research include the mechanisms of DNA transport, the regulation of competence in different bacteria, and the evolutionary function of competence.

== Mechanisms of DNA uptake ==
In the laboratory, DNA is provided by the researcher, often as a genetically engineered fragment or plasmid. During uptake, DNA is transported across the cell membrane(s), and the cell wall if one is present. Once the DNA is inside the cell it may be degraded to nucleotides, which are reused for DNA replication and other metabolic functions. Alternatively it may be recombined into the cell's genome by its DNA repair enzymes. If this recombination changes the cell's genotype the cell is said to have been transformed. Artificial competence and transformation are used as research tools in many organisms.

In almost all naturally competent bacteria components of extracellular filaments called type IV pili bind extracellular double stranded DNA. The DNA is then translocated across the membrane (or membranes for gram negative bacteria) through multi-component protein complexes driven by the degradation of one strand of the DNA. Single stranded DNA in the cell is bound by a well-conserved protein, DprA, which loads the DNA onto RecA, which mediates homologous recombination through the classic DNA repair pathway.

== Regulation of competence ==
In laboratory cultures, natural competence is usually tightly regulated and often triggered by nutritional shortages or adverse conditions. However, the specific inducing signals and regulatory machinery are much more variable than the uptake machinery, regulation systems can vary in different species. Transcription factors have been discovered which regulate competence; an example is sxy (also known as tfoX) which has been found to be regulated in turn by a 5' non-coding RNA element. In bacteria capable of forming spores, conditions inducing sporulation often overlap with those inducing competence. Thus cultures or colonies containing sporulating cells often also contain competent cells.

Most naturally competent bacteria are thought to take up all DNA molecules with roughly equal efficiencies. However, bacteria in some families, such as Neisseriaceae and Pasteurellaceae, preferentially take up DNA fragments containing uptake signal sequences, which are short sequences that are frequent in their own genomes. In Neisseriaceae these sequences are referred as DNA uptake sequence (DUS), while in Pasteurellaceae they're termed uptake signal sequence (USS). Neisserial genomes contain thousands of copies of the preferred sequence GCCGTCTGAA, and Pasteurellacean genomes contain either AAGTGCGGT or ACAAGCGGT.

== Evolutionary functions and consequences of competence ==
Most proposals made for the primary evolutionary function of natural competence as a part of natural bacterial transformation fall into three categories: (1) the selective advantage of genetic diversity; (2) DNA uptake as a source of nucleotides (DNA as “food”); and (3) the selective advantage of a new strand of DNA to promote homologous recombinational repair of damaged DNA (DNA repair). It is possible that multiple proposals are true for different organisms. A secondary suggestion has also been made, noting the occasional advantage of horizontal gene transfer.

=== Hypothesis of genetic diversity ===
According to one hypothesis, bacterial transformation may play the same role in increasing genetic diversity that sex plays in higher organisms. However, the theoretical difficulties associated with the evolution of sex suggest that sex for genetic diversity is problematic. In the case of bacterial transformation, competence requires the high cost of a global protein synthesis switch, with, for example, more than 16 genes that are switched on only during competence of Streptococcus pneumoniae. However, since bacteria tend to grow in clones, the DNA available for transformation would generally have the same genotype as that of the recipient cells. Thus, there is always a high cost in protein expression without, in general, an increase in diversity. Other differences between competence and sex have been considered in models of the evolution of genes causing competence. These models found that competence's postulated recombinational benefits were even more elusive than those of sex.

=== Hypothesis of DNA as food ===
The second hypothesis, DNA as food, relies on the fact that cells that take up DNA inevitably acquire the nucleotides the DNA consists of, and, because nucleotides are needed for DNA and RNA synthesis and are expensive to synthesize, these may make a significant contribution to the cell's energy budget. Some naturally competent bacteria also secrete nucleases into their surroundings, and all bacteria can take up the free nucleotides these nucleases generate from environmental DNA. The energetics of DNA uptake are not understood in any system, so it is difficult to compare the efficiency of nuclease secretion to that of DNA uptake and internal degradation. In principle the cost of nuclease production and the uncertainty of nucleotide recovery must be balanced against the energy needed to synthesize the uptake machinery and to pull DNA in. Other important factors are the likelihoods that nucleases and competent cells will encounter DNA molecules, the relative inefficiencies of nucleotide uptake from the environment and from the periplasm (where one strand is degraded by competent cells), and the advantage of producing ready-to-use nucleotide monophosphates from the other strand in the cytoplasm. Another complicating factor is the self-bias of the DNA uptake systems of species in the family Pasteurellaceae and the genus Neisseria, which could reflect either selection for recombination or for mechanistically efficient uptake.

=== Hypothesis of repair of DNA damage ===
In bacteria, the problem of DNA damage is most pronounced during periods of stress, particularly oxidative stress, that occur during crowding or starvation conditions. Some bacteria induce competence under such stress conditions, supporting the hypothesis that transformation helps DNA repair. In experimental tests, bacterial cells exposed to agents damaging their DNA, and then undergoing transformation, survived better than cells exposed to DNA damage that did not undergo transformation. In addition, competence to undergo transformation is often inducible by known DNA damaging agents. Thus, a strong short-term selective advantage for natural competence and transformation would be its ability to promote homologous recombinational DNA repair under conditions of stress.

=== Horizontal gene transfer ===
A long-term advantage may occasionally be conferred by occasional instances of horizontal gene transfer also called lateral gene transfer, (which might result from non-homologous recombination after competence is induced), that could provide for antibiotic resistance or other advantages.

Regardless of the nature of selection for competence, the composite nature of bacterial genomes provides abundant evidence that the horizontal gene transfer caused by competence contributes to the genetic diversity that makes evolution possible.

== See also ==
- Transformation (genetics)
