= Mutation accumulation experiments =

A mutation accumulation (MA) experiment is a genetic experiment in which isolated and inbred lines of organisms (so-called MA lines) are maintained such that the effect of natural selection is minimized, with the aim of quantitatively estimating the rates at which spontaneous mutations (mutations not caused by exogenous mutagens) occur in the studied organism. Spontaneous mutation rates may be directly estimated using molecular techniques such as DNA sequencing, or indirectly estimated using phenotypic assays (observing how an organism’s phenotype changes as mutations accumulate).

The earliest mutation accumulation experiments were performed by American geneticist Hermann Joseph Muller in the 1920s, using Drosophila melanogaster.

== Principles and procedures ==
All MA lines used in a MA experiment are bred from a single common ancestor, and are often propagated by single-progeny descent, where a single offspring is randomly selected to sire the next generation of organisms. This serves to prevent the loss of mutant alleles through sexual reproduction. Notably, single-progeny descent is only possible if the organism being studied is capable of asexual reproduction or self-fertilization.

A control line is maintained parallel to the MA lines and under the same conditions, except organisms are allowed to reproduce sexually (they are not constrained to single-progeny descent). The assumption underlying this procedure is that the larger, sexually reproducing population of the control line will cause all spontaneous mutations to be ‘weeded out’ by sexual reproduction. Mutations that arise in MA lines are heterozygous at first, and can become fixed or lost at random in subsequent generations. Thus, the control line will be relatively free of mutations, and can be compared with the MA lines to assess the impact of the mutations that have accumulated therein. Both the MA lines and the control line are maintained under relaxed natural selection, to minimize the strain that natural selection places on mutant organisms (which may have reduced fitness). For example, the organisms in a MA experiment may be kept in the ideal environmental conditions and provided with an excess of nutrients.

Mutation accumulation experiments are time-consuming and labor intensive, as a result of the requirement that multiple MA lines be raised parallel to one another for multiple generations, under carefully maintained environmental conditions.

== Estimating mutation rate ==
Phenotypic assays may be performed on the organisms within each MA line, to determine the extent to which the accumulated mutations have affected the organism’s various phenotypic traits. The measured changes in phenotype across generations can be used to indirectly estimate the mutation rate for that organism. With the advent of whole-genome sequencing, the mutation rate of an MA line can be directly estimated by sequencing the MA line and comparing it with sequence data for the control line (i.e., the wild-type organism).

Historically, most MA experiments have estimated mutation rates by using a phenotypic assay to measure the change in the trait value of a phenotype across generations. However, the validity of this approach relies on several assumptions: Since the average mutation is thought to be slightly deleterious, it is assumed that accumulated mutations will cause an organism to become gradually less viable (i.e., that the effect of mutations on the organism’s viability will be unidirectional). It is also assumed that the control line will be free of mutations: since the organisms within the control line are able to freely sexually reproduce, it is thought that most mutations that arise within individuals will be relatively quickly lost during sexual reproduction.

Furthermore, since the organisms in an MA experiment are raised under relaxed natural selection, it is assumed that all mutations that arise have arisen randomly, and become fixed or lost at random, in the absence of any selective pressure exerted by the environment.

== Typical MA experiment ==
A mutation accumulation experiment conducted by Ruth Shaw and colleagues serves as a good example of a typical MA experiment: the group sought to measure the effects of spontaneous mutations on the reproductive traits of Arabidopsis thaliana. A.thaliana is an ideal candidate for a MA experiment because it is capable of self-fertilization, has a relatively short life cycle (of about 10 weeks), and is a well-studied model organism in plant biology and genetics. Shaw and colleagues established 120 lines of A.thaliana, and advanced each line 17 generations by single-progeny descent: each generation was propagated by a single individual randomly selected from a number of self-fertilized seeds sown. The reproductive traits measured as part of the phenotypic assay included seed number per fruit, fruit number, and reproductive mass (the total mass of fruits and seeds from a single plant). The group found that each trait diverged significantly between MA lines, suggesting that mutations had accumulated in some lines.

== MA experiments in obligate sexually reproducing organisms ==
Single-progeny descent is only possible if the organism being studied is capable of asexual reproduction or self-fertilization. In cases where an organism is only capable of sexual reproduction (such as Drosophila melanogaster, which was the species used in many early MA experiments), organisms with balancer chromosomes are used.

In MA experiments involving an obligate sexually reproducing species such as Drosophila, mutations are accumulated on only one of a pair of homologous chromosomes. The other homologous chromosome is a modified so-called balancer chromosome. Balancer chromosomes contain a sizable inversion relative to their homologue, which serves to prevent recombination of the balancer chromosome with its homologue during meiosis. Additionally, the balancer chromosome may contain a number of mutations. While the exact mutation(s) may vary, it is important that they achieve two things. First, the mutation(s) must create a physically visible phenotype in heterozygous organisms. This allows organisms that carry a balancer and an unmodified chromosome (organisms that are ideal for the MA experiment) to be easily identified. Second, the mutation(s) must also be homozygous lethal, so that any organism that inherits two balancer chromosomes (i.e. an organism useless to the MA experiment) will not survive.

Using this system, a proportion of the offspring created by sexual reproduction will inherit a balancer chromosome and its homologue. This homologue is passed down across generations without having its mutations disrupted by recombination during sexual reproduction, allowing it to properly accumulate mutations.

== Significance ==
MA experiments allow researchers to study the rates and properties of new mutations. Since mutation is the ultimate source of genetic diversity in all living organisms, researchers are interested in knowing how often mutations arise, and in understanding the phenotypic impacts on newly-arisen mutations, in order to better understand the patterns underlying adaptation and evolution.

== Derived Estimates of Mutational Parameters ==
Mutation accumulation experiments are an important means by which to estimate mutational parameters. As the name suggests, these parameters define the rate at which different types of mutations occur in a given organism. Their estimation is important because mutations are the ultimate source of genetic variation as well as being involved in the pathogenesis of many common diseases. As such, understanding how often they occur, as well as what consequences they are likely to carry when they do occur can yield significant insight into these issues. The mutation rate in the nuclear genome varies quite significantly across species, while that of the mitochondrial genome is much more consistent, with most estimates of this latter parameter in unicellular and multicellular eukaryotes ranging from 0.76 to 1.6 × 10^{−7} mutations per site per generation. Since these parameters have been ascertained for only a small number of species because of how labor intensive this approach can be, a significant amount of this type of work has been done in various model organisms.

For example, in the nuclear genome of Drosophila melanogaster, one study placed the rate of single-nucleotide mutation at 3.5 × 10^{−9} mutations per site per generation, while another study obtained a value of 5.8 × 10^{−9} mutations per site per generation for the same parameter. Estimates of the D. melanogaster mitochondrial genome mutation rate are generally ~10 times higher than that of the nuclear genome, with one estimate being 6.2 × 10^{−8} mutations per site per generation. The rate of occurrence for deleterious mutations per generation (Ud) can be obtained by multiplying the average number of mutations per generation by the proportion of mutations which are expected to be deleterious within a given species. However, it can also be estimated by way of fitness assays using MA lines of known genotype. In Drosophila melanogaster, one study placed the value of this parameter at 1.2 deleterious mutations per diploid genome per generation, which matches closely the average value of this parameter within this species across all studies on the subject conducted as of 1999. However, the putative Ud values obtained by way of similar mutation accumulation-based studies have varied significantly, with some estimates being as low as 0.02 deleterious mutations per diploid genome per generation, a value not much higher than the putative lethal mutation rate of 0.01 mutations per generation. Uncharacteristically low values such as this are usually obtained in studies that classify mutations as either deleterious or not by screening for quantifiable decreases in viability. This is because these studies are thought to overlook the vast majority of deleterious mutations for which the overall effect on viability is too small in magnitude to be observed by way of such assays. Higher Ud values (>1) that are more in line with current scientific consensus regarding the estimation of this parameter in D. melanogaster suggest that selection against these deleterious mutations may play a significant role in shaping patterns of genetic variation in the genome, as well as in maintaining selection for recombination and sexual reproduction.

For Caenorhabditis elegans, a nematode that is one of the most commonly used model organisms in molecular and developmental biology research, one estimate of the nuclear genome mutation rate is 2.1 × 10^{−8} mutations per site per generation. The value of Ud within the species was in 1997 directly estimated to be 0.0026 deleterious mutations per generation, which is two orders of magnitude smaller than previous indirect estimates. A newer estimate based on laboratory fitness assays of MA lines placed this parameter at 0.015 deleterious mutations per generation. However, as previously mentioned, such assays may overlook mutations which produce negative consequences of modest magnitude. These are thought to represent the vast majority of deleterious mutations, and possibly even the majority of all mutations within this species. Authors have also noted that insertions are the predominant type of mutation observed in MA studies using C. elegans. The mitochondrial mutation rate in this species has been estimated at 1.05 × 10^{−7} mutations per site per generation.

In the yeast, Saccharomyces cerevisiae, the nuclear genomic rate of single nucleotide mutations was estimated to be 1.67 ± 0.04 × 10^{−10} per site per generation, while the rate of small insertions/deletions was estimated to be 5.03 ± 0.99 × 10^{−12} per site per generation. As far as aneuploidy and other large copy number variant events in this organism, the rate of whole-chromosome duplication was found to be 9.7 ± 1.8 × 10^{−5} events per diploid genome per generation, while the rate of chromosome loss was estimated at 0.7 ± 0.04 × 10^{−5} events per diploid genome per generation.
