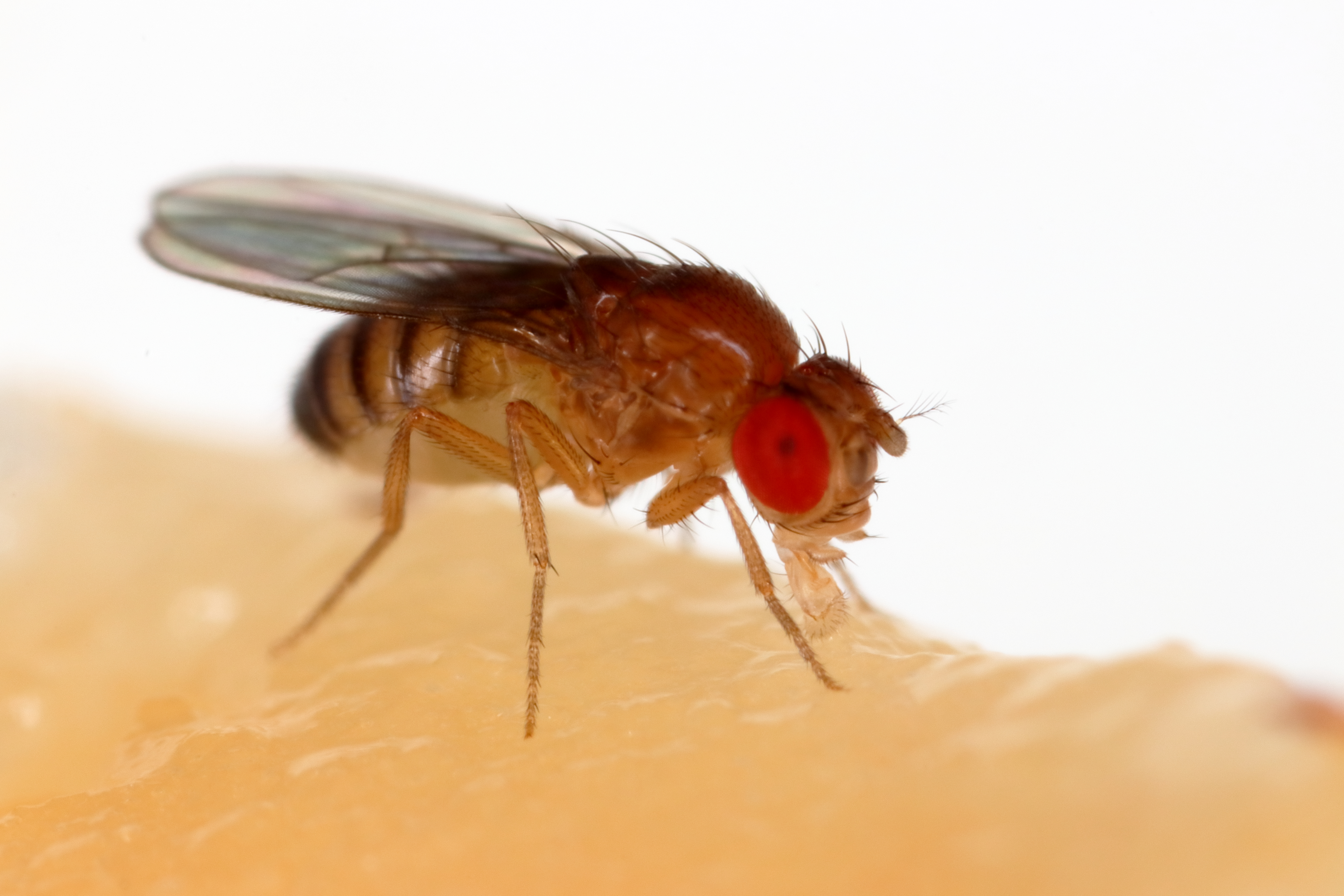
- Fruit fly feeding on a banana

Scientific classification
- Kingdom: Animalia
- Phylum: Arthropoda
- Clade: Pancrustacea
- Class: Insecta
- Order: Diptera
- Family: Drosophilidae
- Genus: Drosophila
- Subgenus: Sophophora
- Species group: melanogaster
- Species subgroup: melanogaster
- Species complex: melanogaster
- Species: D. melanogaster

Binomial name
- Drosophila melanogaster Meigen, 1830

Synonyms
- List: Drosophila ampelophaga Meigen, 1830; Drosophila melanocephala Meigen, 1830; Drosophila melanogaster Meigen, 1830 (Ambiguous); Drosophila aceti Heeger, 1851; Drosophila ampelophila Loew, 1862; Drosophila approximata Zetterstedt, 1847; Drosophila artificialis Kozhevnikov, 1936; Drosophila emulata Chaudhuri & Mukherjee, 1941; Drosophila immatura Walker, 1849; Drosophila pilosula Becker, 1908; Musca cellaris Linnaeus, 1758; Drosophila fasciata Meigen, 1830 (Ambiguous); Drosophila nigriventris Macquart, 1844 (Ambiguous)

= Drosophila melanogaster =

Species of fruit fly

Drosophila melanogaster is a species of fly (an insect of the order Diptera) in the family Drosophilidae. The species is often referred to as the fruit fly or lesser fruit fly, or less commonly the "vinegar fly", "pomace fly", (Note: "Vinegar fly" is preferred by a handful of recent publications as being a more accurate description than "fruit fly".) or "banana fly". D. melanogaster is attracted to rotting fruit and fermenting beverages and is often found in orchards, kitchens, and pubs.

Starting with Charles W. Woodworth's 1901 proposal of the use of this species as a model organism, D. melanogaster continues to be widely used for biological research in genetics, physiology, microbial pathogenesis, and life history evolution. In 1947 D. melanogaster was the first animal to be launched into space. As of 2017, six Nobel Prizes have been awarded to drosophilists for their work using the insect.

Drosophila melanogaster is typically used in research owing to its rapid life cycle, relatively simple genetics with only four pairs of chromosomes, and large number of offspring per generation. It was originally an African species, with all non-African lineages having a common origin. Its geographic range includes all continents, including islands. D. melanogaster is a common pest in homes, restaurants, and other places where food is served.

Flies belonging to the family Tephritidae are also called "fruit flies". This can cause confusion, especially in the Mediterranean, Australia, and South Africa, where the Mediterranean fruit fly Ceratitis capitata is an economic pest.

== Etymology ==
The term "Drosophila", meaning "dew-loving", is a modern scientific Latin adaptation from Greek words δρόσος, drósos, "dew", and φίλος, philos, "loving". The term "melanogaster", meaning "black belly", comes from Ancient Greek μέλας, mélas, "black", and γᾰστήρ, gastḗr, "belly".

== Physical appearance ==
Wild type fruit flies are yellow-brown, with brick-red eyes and transverse black rings across the abdomen.

The fly's body is divided into three main parts: head, thorax, and abdomen. The head is relatively round and features large, prominent red compound eyes. These eyes are made up of hundreds of ommatidia and occupy most of the head's surface. The brick-red color of the eyes of the wild type fly are due to two pigments: xanthommatin, which is brown and is derived from tryptophan, and drosopterins, which are red and are derived from guanosine triphosphate. Between the eyes are short antennae, which look like tiny feathery or bristled projections and are used for detecting odors, air currents, and vibrations. Drosophila also has bristles—short, stiff hairs—distributed across the head and body, which are useful for tactile sensing.

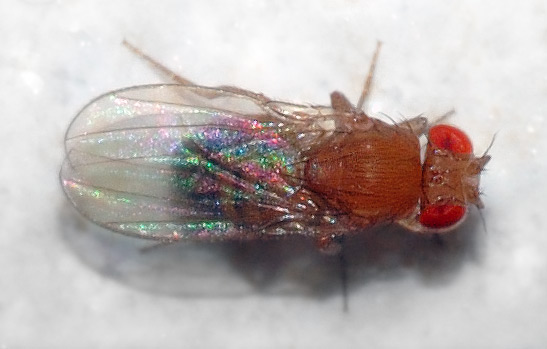
View from above

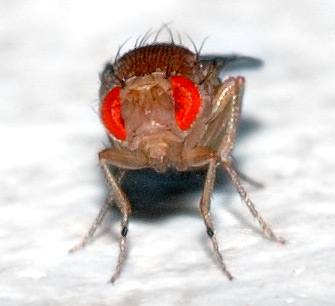
Frontal view

The thorax is robust and bears three pairs of legs and one pair of wings. The wings are clear and membranous, with fine veins visible, and span approximately 4 mm. They are held flat over the back when the fly is at rest. Just behind the wings are small knob-like structures called halteres, which are modified hindwings. These help the fly maintain balance and orientation in flight.

The drosophila leg is composed of five leg segments: the coxa, trochanter, femur, tibia, and tarsus. They have five tarsal segments in their tarsus, ending with the fly foot which has multiple structures including the claw and adhesive structures. The pulvillus, a flexible elongated structure underneath the claw, and setae, hair-like structures that are spatula-shaped and inset the pulvilli, are the main attachment devices used by D. melanogaster, although their claws may be used for attachment onto rough surfaces. Males also have sex combs located on the first tarsal segment, which are tiny bristle-like structures on their front legs, used to attach to females during mating. Extensive images are found at FlyBase.

The abdomen is segmented and tapers toward the end. It often appears striped, with alternating bands of light and dark pigmentation. In males, the abdomen is typically darker and more rounded, while females have a more pointed and striped abdomen. The black portions of the abdomen are the inspiration for the species name (melanogaster = "black-bellied").

They exhibit sexual dimorphism; females are about 2.5 mm (0.10 in) long, while males are slightly smaller. Females have bodies that are up to 30% larger than an adult male. Unlike humans, the sex and physical appearance of fruit flies is not influenced by hormones. The appearance and sex of fruit flies is determined only by genetic information.

Female (left) and male (right) D. melanogaster

Drosophila melanogaster can be distinguished from related species by the following combination of features: gena ~1/10 diameter of eye at greatest vertical height; wing hyaline and with costal index 2.4; male protarsus with a single row of ~12 setae forming a sex comb; male epandrial posterior lobe small and nearly triangular; female abdominal tergite 6 with dark band running to its ventral margin; female oviscapt small, pale, without dorsodistal depression and with 12–13 peg-like outer ovisensilla.

== Lifecycle and reproduction ==
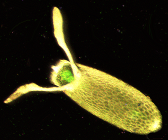
Egg of D. melanogaster

Under optimal growth conditions at 25 °C (77 °F), the D. melanogaster lifespan is about 50 days from egg to death. The developmental period for D. melanogaster varies with temperature, as with many ectothermic species. The shortest development time (egg to adult), seven days, is achieved at 28 °C (82 °F). Development times increase at higher temperatures (11 days at 30 °C or 86 °F) due to heat stress. Under ideal conditions, the development time at 25 °C (77 °F) is 8 1/2 days, at 18 °C (64 °F) it takes 19 days and at 12 °C (54 °F) it takes over 50 days. Under crowded conditions, development time increases, while the emerging flies are smaller. Females lay some 400 eggs (embryos), about five at a time, into rotting fruit or other suitable material such as decaying mushrooms and sap fluxes. Drosophila melanogaster is a holometabolous insect, so it undergoes a full metamorphosis.

Their life cycle is broken down into four stages: embryo, larva, pupa, adult. The eggs, which are about 0.5 mm long, hatch after 12–15 hours (at 25 °C or 77 °F). The resulting larvae grow for about four days (at 25 °C) while molting twice (into second- and third-instar larvae), at about 24 and 48 hours after hatching. During this time, they feed on the microorganisms that decompose the fruit, as well as on the sugar of the fruit itself. The mother puts feces on the egg sacs to establish the same microbial composition in the larvae's guts that has worked positively for herself. Before entering metamorphosis, the larvae expel a transparent glue from their salivary gland through their mouth, which solidifies within a few seconds and fixes them into a substrate. Then the larvae encapsulate in the puparium and undergo a four-day-long metamorphosis (at 25 °C), after which the adults eclose (emerge).

Sound of Drosophila heartbeat

Males perform a sequence of five behavioral patterns to court females. First, males orient themselves while playing a courtship song by horizontally extending and vibrating their wings. Soon after, the male positions himself at the rear of the female's abdomen in a low posture to tap and lick the female genitalia. Finally, the male curls his abdomen and attempts copulation. Females can reject males by moving away, kicking, and extruding their ovipositor. Copulation lasts around 15–20 minutes, during which males transfer a few hundred, very long (1.76 mm) sperm cells in seminal fluid to the female. Females store the sperm in a tubular receptacle and in two mushroom-shaped spermathecae; sperm from multiple matings compete for fertilization. A last male precedence is believed to exist; the last male to mate with a female sires about 80% of her offspring.

This precedence was found to occur through both displacement and incapacitation. The displacement is attributed to sperm handling by the female fly as multiple matings are conducted and is most significant during the first 1–2 days after copulation. Displacement from the seminal receptacle is more significant than displacement from the spermathecae. Incapacitation of first male sperm by second male sperm becomes significant 2–7 days after copulation. The seminal fluid of the second male is believed to be responsible for this incapacitation mechanism (without removal of first male sperm) which takes effect before fertilization occurs. The delay in effectiveness of the incapacitation mechanism is believed to be a protective mechanism that prevents a male fly from incapacitating his own sperm should he mate with the same female fly repetitively. Sensory neurons in the uterus of female D. melanogaster respond to a male protein, sex peptide, which is found in semen.

This protein makes the female reluctant to copulate for about 10 days after insemination. The signal pathway leading to this change in behavior has been determined. The signal is sent to a brain region that is a homolog of the hypothalamus and the hypothalamus then controls sexual behavior and desire. Gonadotropic hormones in Drosophila maintain homeostasis and govern reproductive output via a cyclic interrelationship, not unlike the mammalian estrous cycle. Sex peptide perturbs this homeostasis and dramatically shifts the endocrine state of the female by inciting juvenile hormone synthesis in the corpus allatum.

D. melanogaster is often used for life extension studies, such as to identify genes purported to increase lifespan when mutated. D. melanogaster is also used in studies of aging. Werner syndrome is a condition in humans characterized by accelerated aging. It is caused by mutations in the gene WRN that encodes a protein with essential roles in repair of DNA damage. Mutations in the D. melanogaster homolog of WRN also cause increased physiologic signs of aging, such as shorter lifespan, higher tumor incidence, muscle degeneration, reduced climbing ability, altered behavior and reduced locomotor activity.

=== Meiosis ===
Meiotic recombination in D. melanogaster appears to be employed in repairing damage in germ-line DNA as indicated by the findings that meiotic recombination is induced by the DNA damaging agents ultraviolet light and mitomycin C.

=== Females ===
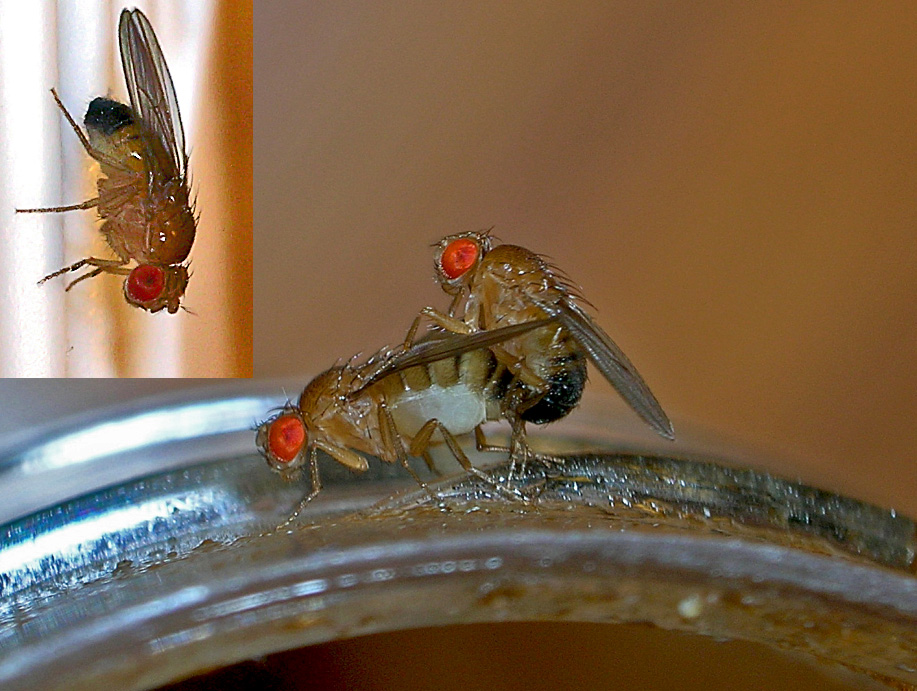
Mating in captivity

Females become receptive to courting males about 8–12 hours after emergence. Specific neuron groups in females have been found to affect copulation behavior and mate choice. One such group in the abdominal nerve cord allows the female fly to pause her body movements to copulate. Activation of these neurons induces the female to cease movement and orient herself towards the male to allow for mounting. If the group is inactivated, the female remains in motion and does not copulate. Various chemical signals such as male pheromones often are able to activate the group.

Also, females exhibit mate choice copying. When virgin females are shown other females copulating with a certain type of male, they tend to copulate more with this type of male afterwards than naïve females (which have not observed the copulation of others). This behavior is sensitive to environmental conditions, and females copulate less in bad weather conditions.

=== Males ===
Courtship behavior in male. The male first showed wing extension (stage 1), and later other steps such as abdomen bending (stage 2), then frequent attempted copulation, licking and even ejaculation (stage 3), finally the male fell over and was on its back (stage 4).

D. melanogaster males exhibit a strong reproductive learning curve. That is, with sexual experience, these flies tend to modify their future mating behavior in multiple ways. These changes include increased selectivity for courting only intraspecifically, as well as decreased courtship times.

Sexually naïve D. melanogaster males are known to spend significant time courting interspecifically, such as with D. simulans flies. Naïve D. melanogaster will also attempt to court females that are not yet sexually mature, and other males. D. melanogaster males show little to no preference for D. melanogaster females over females of other species or even other male flies. However, after D. simulans or other flies incapable of copulation have rejected the males' advances, D. melanogaster males are much less likely to spend time courting nonspecifically in the future. This apparent learned behavior modification seems to be evolutionarily significant, because it allows the males to avoid investing energy into futile sexual encounters.

In addition, males with previous sexual experience modify their courtship dance when attempting to mate with new females—the experienced males spend less time courting, so have lower mating latencies, meaning that they are able to reproduce more quickly. This decreased mating latency leads to a greater mating efficiency for experienced males over naïve males. This modification also appears to have obvious evolutionary advantages, because increased mating efficiency is extremely important in the eyes of natural selection.

=== Polygamy ===
Both male and female D. melanogaster flies act polygamously (having multiple sexual partners at the same time). In both males and females, polygamy results in a decrease in evening activity compared to virgin flies, more so in males than females. Evening activity consists of those in which the flies participate other than mating and finding partners, such as finding food. The reproductive success of males and females varies, because a female only needs to mate once to reach maximum fertility. Mating with multiple partners provides no advantage over mating with one partner, so females exhibit no difference in evening activity between polygamous and monogamous individuals. For males, however, mating with multiple partners increases their reproductive success by increasing the genetic diversity of their offspring. This benefit of genetic diversity is an evolutionary advantage because it increases the chance that some of the offspring will have traits that increase their fitness in their environment.

The difference in evening activity between polygamous and monogamous male flies can be explained with courtship. For polygamous flies, their reproductive success increases by having offspring with multiple partners, and therefore they spend more time and energy on courting multiple females. On the other hand, monogamous flies only court one female, and expend less energy doing so. While it requires more energy for male flies to court multiple females, the overall reproductive benefits it produces has kept polygamy as the preferred sexual choice.

The mechanism that affects courtship behavior in Drosophila is controlled by the oscillator neurons DN1s and LNDs. Oscillation of the DN1 neurons was found to be effected by sociosexual interactions, and is connected to mating-related decrease of evening activity.

== Model organism in genetics ==
D. melanogaster remains one of the most studied organisms in biological research, particularly in genetics and developmental biology. It is also employed in studies of environmental mutagenesis.

=== History of use in genetic analysis ===
Alfred Sturtevant's Drosophila melanogaster genetic linkage map: This was the first successful gene mapping work and provides important evidence for the chromosome theory of inheritance. The map shows the relative positions of allelic characteristics on the second Drosophila chromosome. The distance between the genes (map units) are equal to the percentage of crossing-over events that occurs between different alleles.

D. melanogaster was among the first organisms used for genetic analysis, and today it is one of the most widely used and genetically best-known of all eukaryotic organisms. All organisms use common genetic systems; therefore, comprehending processes such as transcription and replication in fruit flies helps in understanding these processes in other eukaryotes, including humans.

Thomas Hunt Morgan began using fruit flies in experimental studies of heredity at Columbia University in 1910 in a laboratory known as the Fly Room. The Fly Room was cramped with eight desks, each occupied by students and their experiments. They started off experiments using milk bottles to rear the fruit flies and handheld lenses for observing their traits. The lenses were later replaced by microscopes, which enhanced their observations. Morgan and his students eventually elucidated many basic principles of heredity, including sex-linked inheritance, epistasis, multiple alleles, and gene mapping.

D. melanogaster had historically been used in laboratories to study genetics and patterns of inheritance. However, D. melanogaster also has importance in environmental mutagenesis research, allowing researchers to study the effects of specific environmental mutagens.

=== Reasons for use in laboratories ===
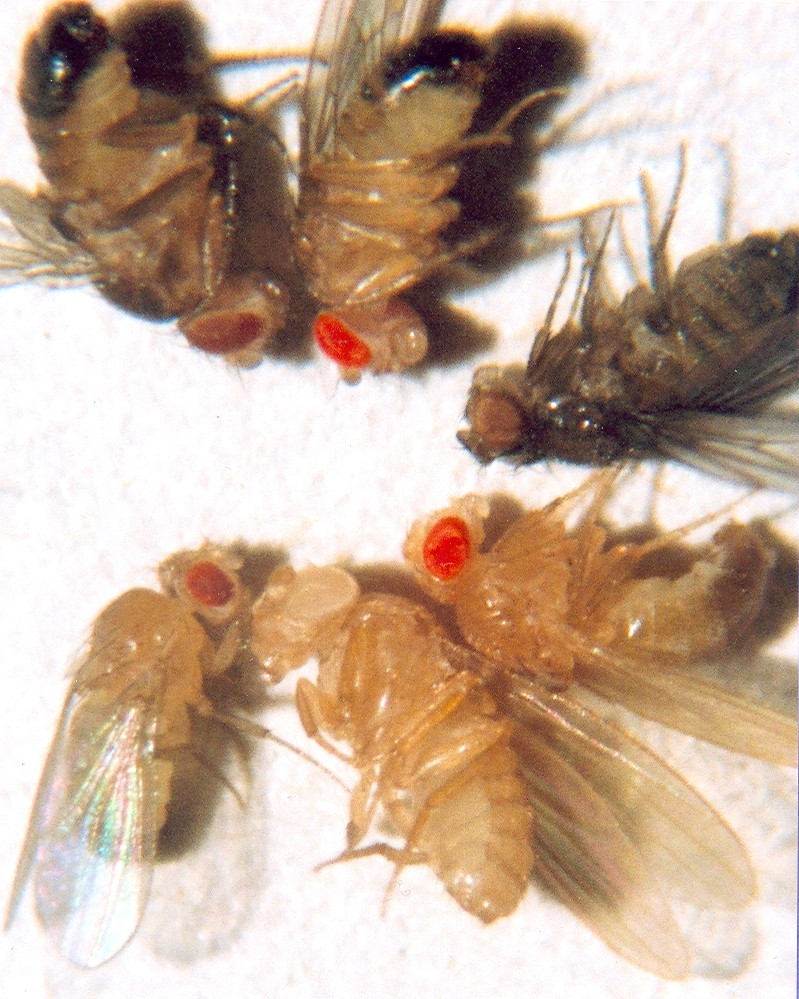
D. melanogaster multiple mutants (clockwise from top): brown eyes and black cuticle (2 mutations), cinnabar eyes and wildtype cuticle (1 mutation), sepia eyes and ebony cuticle, vermilion eyes and yellow cuticle, white eyes and yellow cuticle, wildtype eyes and yellow cuticle

There are many reasons the fruit fly is a popular choice as a model organism:

- About 75% of human disease-causing genes have a functional equivalent in the fruit fly genome
- Its care and culture require little equipment, space, and expense even when using large cultures.
- It can be safely and readily anesthetized (usually with ether, carbon dioxide gas, by cooling, or with products such as FlyNap).
- Its morphology is easy to identify once anesthetized.
- It has a short generation time (about 10 days at room temperature), so several generations can be studied within a few weeks.
- It has a high fecundity (females lay up to 100 eggs per day, and perhaps 2,000 in a lifetime).
- Males and females are readily distinguished, and virgin females can be easily identified by their light-colored, translucent abdomen, facilitating genetic crossing.
- The mature larva has giant chromosomes in the salivary glands called polytene chromosomes, "puffs", which indicate regions of transcription, hence gene activity. The under-replication of rDNA occurs resulting in only 20% of DNA compared to the brain. Compare to the 47%, less rDNA in Sarcophaga barbata ovaries.
- It has only four pairs of chromosomes—three autosomes, and one pair of sex chromosomes.
- Males do not show meiotic recombination, facilitating genetic studies.
- Recessive lethal "balancer chromosomes" carrying visible genetic markers can be used to keep stocks of lethal alleles in a heterozygous state without recombination due to multiple inversions in the balancer.
- The development of this organism—from fertilized egg to mature adult—is well understood.
- Genetic transformation techniques have been available since 1987. One approach of inserting foreign genes into the Drosophila genome involves P elements. The transposable P elements, also known as transposons, are segments of bacterial DNA that are transferred into the fly genome. Transgenic flies have already contributed to many scientific advances, e.g., modeling such human diseases as Parkinson's, neoplasia, obesity, and diabetes. Thousands of genetic strains, optimized for different purposes, are readily available from sources such as the Bloomington Drosophila Stock Center.
- Its complete genome was sequenced and first published in 2000.
- Its connectome, a list of the fly's neurons and their interconnections, is available for the larva and both male and female flies.
- Sexual mosaics can be readily produced, providing an additional tool for studying the development and behavior of these flies.

=== Genetic markers ===
D. melanogaster which carries the Cy allele (right), hence showing a characteristic phenotype of curly wings in adult flies

Genetic markers are commonly used in Drosophila research, for example within balancer chromosomes or P-element inserts, and most phenotypes are easily identifiable either with the naked eye or under a microscope. In the list of a few common markers below, the allele symbol is followed by the name of the gene affected and a description of its phenotype. (Note: Recessive alleles are in lower case, while dominant alleles are capitalised.)

- Cy^{1}: Curly; the wings curve away from the body, flight may be somewhat impaired
- e^{1}: Ebony; black body and wings (heterozygotes are also visibly darker than wild type)
- Sb^{1}: Stubble; bristles are shorter and thicker than wild type
- w^{1}: White; eyes lack pigmentation and appear white
- bw: Brown; eye color determined by various pigments combined.
- y^{1}: Yellow; body pigmentation and wings appear yellow, the fly analog of albinism

=== Classic genetic mutations ===
Drosophila genes are traditionally named after the phenotype they cause when mutated. For example, the absence of a particular gene in Drosophila will result in a mutant embryo that does not develop a heart. Scientists have thus called this gene tinman, named after the Oz character of the same name. Likewise changes in the Shavenbaby gene cause the loss of dorsal cuticular hairs in Drosophila sechellia larvae. This system of nomenclature results in a wider range of gene names than in other organisms.

- b: black – The black mutation was discovered in 1910 by Thomas Hunt Morgan. The black mutation results in a darker colored body, wings, veins, and segments of the fruit fly's leg. This occurs due to the fly's inability to create beta-alanine, a beta amino acid. The phenotypic expression of this mutation varies based on the genotype of the individual; for example, whether the specimen is homozygotic or heterozygotic results in a darker or less dark appearance. This genetic mutation is x-linked recessive.
- bw: brown – The brown eye mutation results from inability to produce or synthesize pteridine (red) pigments, due to a point mutation on chromosome II.
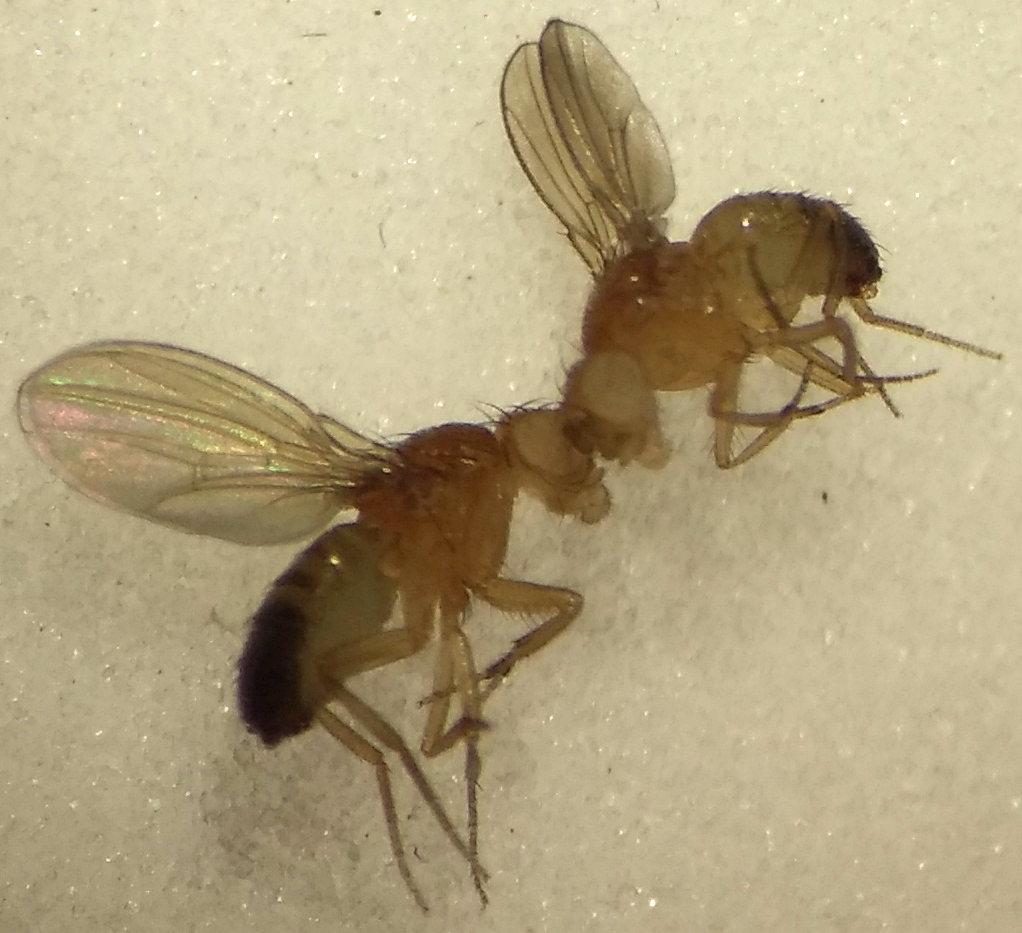
- Wild-type wing (left) vs. miniature wing (right)
  m: miniature – One of the first records of the miniature mutation of wings was also made by Thomas Hunt Morgan in 1911. He described the wings as having a similar shape as the wild-type phenotype. However, their miniature designation refers to the lengths of their wings, which do not stretch beyond their body and, thus, are notably shorter than the wild-type length. He also noted its inheritance is connected to the sex of the fly and could be paired with the inheritance of other sex-determined traits such as white eyes. Miniature wings are 1.5 times shorter than wild-type but are believed to have the same number of cells. This is due to the lack of complete flattening by these cells, making the overall structure of the wing seem shorter in comparison.
- se: sepia – The eye color of the sepia mutant is sepia, a reddish-brown color. In wild-type flies, ommochromes (brown) and drosopterins (red) give the eyes the typical red color. The drosopterins are made via a pathway that involves a pyrimidodiazepine synthase, which is encoded on chromosome 3L. The gene has a premature stop codon in sepia flies, so that the flies cannot produce the pyrimidodiazepine synthase and thus no red pigment, so that the eyes stay sepia. The sepia allele is recessive and thus offspring from sepia flies and homozygous wild type flies, has red eyes. The sepia phenotype does not depend on the sex of the fly.
- v: vermilion – The vermilion mutants cannot produce the brown ommochromes leaving the red drosopterins so that the eyes are vermilion colored (a radiant red) compared to a wild-type D. melanogaster. The vermilion mutation is sex-linked and recessive. The gene that is defective lies on the X chromosome. The brown ommochromes are synthesised from kynurenine, which is made from tryptophane. Vermilion flies cannot convert tryptophane into kynurenine and thus cannot make ommochromes, either. Vermilion mutants live longer than wild-type flies. This longer life span may be associated with the reduced amount of tryptophan converted to kynurenine in vermilion flies.

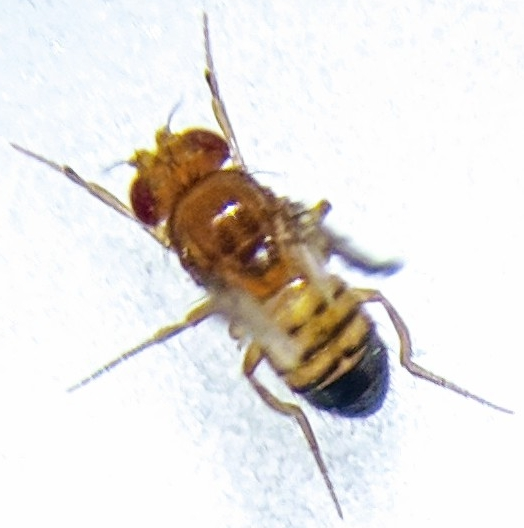
Triple mutant male fruit fly (Drosophila melanogaster) exhibiting black body, vestigial wings, and brown eyes mutations

- vg: vestigial – A spontaneous mutation, discovered in 1919 by Thomas Morgan and Calvin Bridges. Vestigial wings are those not fully developed and that have lost function. Since the discovery of the vestigial gene in Drosophila melanogaster, there have been many discoveries of the vestigial gene in other vertebrates and their functions within the vertebrates. The vestigial gene is considered to be one of the most important genes for wing formation, but when it becomes over expressed the issue of ectopic wings begin to form. The vestigial gene acts to regulate the expression of the wing imaginal discs in the embryo and acts with other genes to regulate the development of the wings. A mutated vestigial allele removes an essential sequence of the DNA required for correct development of the wings.
- w: white – Drosophila melanogaster wild type typically expresses a brick-red eye color. The white eye mutation in fruit flies is caused due to the absence of two pigments associated with red and brown eye colors; peridines (red) and ommochromes (brown). In January 1910, Thomas Hunt Morgan first discovered the white gene and denoted it as w. The discovery of the white-eye mutation by Morgan brought about the beginnings of genetic experimentation and analysis of Drosophila melanogaster. Hunt eventually discovered that the gene followed a similar pattern of inheritance related to the meiotic segregation of the X chromosome. He discovered that the gene was located on the X chromosome with this information. This led to the discovery of sex-linked genes and also to the discovery of other mutations in Drosophila melanogaster. The white-eye mutation leads to several disadvantages in flies, such as a reduced climbing ability, shortened life span, and lowered resistance to stress when compared to wild type flies.
- y: yellow – The yellow gene in Drosophila is an X-lined gene required for producing black melanin pigment in the fly's cuticle, wings, and larval mouthparts. Loss-of-function mutations in this gene leaves flies with a lighter, yellowish appearance. The role of the yellow gene is diverse and is responsible for changes in behaviour, sex-specific reproductive maturation and, epigenetic reprogramming.

== Genome ==
Genomic information
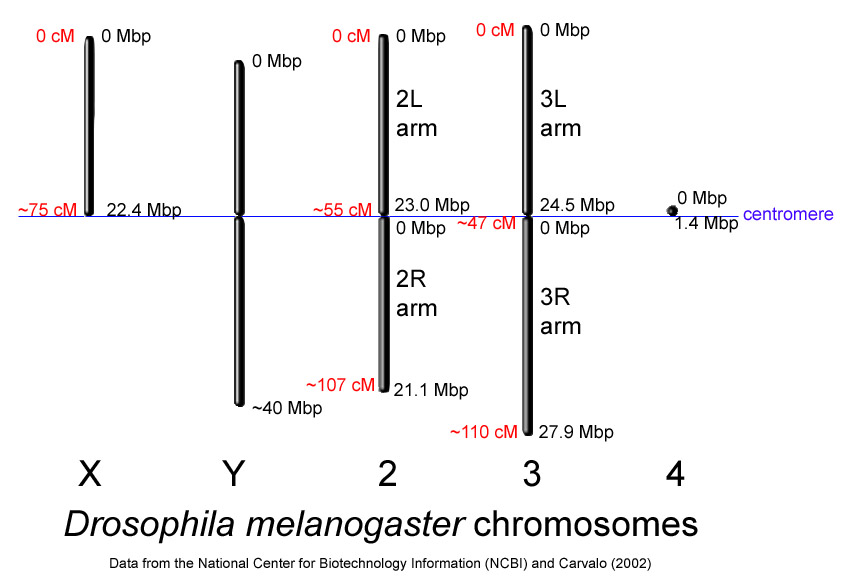
- D. melanogaster chromosomes to scale with megabase-pair references oriented as in the National Center for Biotechnology Information database, centimorgan distances are approximate and estimated from the locations of selected mapped loci.
- NCBI ID: 7227
- Ploidy: diploid
- Number of chromosomes: 8
- Year of completion: 2015

The genome of D. melanogaster (sequenced in 2000, and curated at the FlyBase database) contains four pairs of chromosomes—an X/Y pair, and three autosomes labeled 2, 3, and 4. The fourth chromosome is relatively very small and therefore often ignored, aside from its important eyeless gene. The D. melanogaster sequenced genome of 139.5 million base pairs has been annotated and contains around 15,682 genes (Ensemble release 73), including 13,822 protein-coding genes. More than 60% of the genome appears to be functional non-protein-coding DNA. Determination of sex in Drosophila occurs by the X:A ratio of X chromosomes to autosomes, not because of the presence of a Y chromosome as in human sex determination. Although the Y chromosome is entirely heterochromatic, it contains at least 16 genes, many of which are thought to have male-related functions.

The D. melanogaster genome has undergone continual refinement. Release 6 of the reference genome (strain ISO-1) from 2015 "effectively exhausts clone-based technologies for mapping and sequencing", producing numerous corrections compared to the previous release. It measured 143.9 million base pairs (133.88 of which are on chromosome-arm scaffolds), the increase reflecting the additional work done to tackle repetitive regions. Some repetitive sequences in heterochromatin remain beyond the researchers' reach. An independent 2024 assembly of the same strain using a new technique (PacBio HiFi) produced an extra 4.17 million base pairs total and 8.0 million base pairs on chromosome arms.

In 2024, a near-complete "telomere-to-telomere" genome assembly was produced for D. melanogaster strain Canton S, closing 93.28% of gaps in the release 6 genome. This was enabled by a combination of PacBio HiFi, Oxford Nanopore ultra-long reads, and Hi-C data. It measured 161.63 million base pairs, though a lot of the increase relative to reference appear to reflect actual strain-to-strain variation (and not an error in the R6 genome).

D. melanogaster originated in sub-Saharan Africa and populations diverged as the species expanded across the globe. As of 2024, there are more than 1439 genome sequences representing the global diversity of this species, allowing for a detailed estimate of its global evolutionary history.

=== Similarity to humans ===
A June 2001 study by National Human Genome Research Institute comparing the fruit fly and human genome estimated that about 60% of genes are conserved between the two species. About 75% of known human disease genes have a recognizable match in the genome of fruit flies, and 50% of fly protein sequences have mammalian homologs. An online database called Homophila is available to search for human disease gene homologues in flies and vice versa.

Drosophila is being used as a genetic model for several human diseases including the neurodegenerative disorders Parkinson's, Huntington's, spinocerebellar ataxia and Alzheimer's disease. The fly is also being used to study mechanisms underlying aging and oxidative stress, immunity, diabetes, and cancer, as well as drug abuse.

== Development ==
The life cycle of this insect has four stages: fertilized egg, larva, pupa, and adult.

Embryogenesis in Drosophila has been extensively studied, as its small size, short generation time, and large brood size makes it ideal for genetic studies. It is also unique among model organisms in that cleavage occurs in a syncytium.

D. melanogaster egg, mid-oogenesis. Stained to show cell membranes (phalloidin, magenta), nuclei (DAPI, blue), and Broad protein (green).

During oogenesis, cytoplasmic bridges called "ring canals" connect the forming oocyte to nurse cells. Nutrients and developmental control molecules move from the nurse cells into the oocyte. In the figure to the left, the forming oocyte can be seen to be covered by follicular support cells.

After fertilization of the oocyte, the early embryo (or syncytial embryo) undergoes rapid DNA replication and 13 nuclear divisions until about 5000 to 6000 nuclei accumulate in the unseparated cytoplasm of the embryo. By the end of the eighth division, most nuclei have migrated to the surface, surrounding the yolk sac (leaving behind only a few nuclei, which will become the yolk nuclei). After the 10th division, the pole cells form at the posterior end of the embryo, segregating the germ line from the syncytium. Finally, after the 13th division, cell membranes slowly invaginate, dividing the syncytium into individual somatic cells. Once this process is completed, gastrulation starts.

Nuclear division in the early Drosophila embryo happens so quickly, no proper checkpoints exist, so mistakes may be made in division of the DNA. To get around this problem, the nuclei that have made a mistake detach from their centrosomes and fall into the centre of the embryo (yolk sac), which will not form part of the fly.

The gene network (transcriptional and protein interactions) governing the early development of the fruit fly embryo is one of the best understood gene networks to date, especially the patterning along the anteroposterior (AP) and dorsoventral (DV) axes (See under morphogenesis).

The embryo undergoes well-characterized morphogenetic movements during gastrulation and early development, including germ-band extension, formation of several furrows, ventral invagination of the mesoderm, and posterior and anterior invagination of endoderm (gut), as well as extensive body segmentation until finally hatching from the surrounding cuticle into a first-instar larva.

During larval development, tissues known as imaginal discs grow inside the larva. Imaginal discs develop to form most structures of the adult body, such as the head, legs, wings, thorax, and genitalia. Cells of the imaginal disks are set aside during embryogenesis and continue to grow and divide during the larval stages—unlike most other cells of the larva, which have differentiated to perform specialized functions and grow without further cell division. At metamorphosis, the larva forms a pupa, inside which the larval tissues are reabsorbed and the imaginal tissues undergo extensive morphogenetic movements to form adult structures.

=== Developmental plasticity ===
Biotic and abiotic factors experienced during development will affect developmental resource allocation leading to phenotypic variation, also referred to as developmental plasticity. As in all insects, environmental factors can influence several aspects of development in Drosophila melanogaster. Fruit flies reared under a hypoxia treatment experience decreased thorax length, while hyperoxia produces smaller flight muscles, suggesting negative developmental effects of extreme oxygen levels. Circadian rhythms are also subject to developmental plasticity. Light conditions during development affect daily activity patterns in Drosophila melanogaster, where flies raised under constant dark or light are less active as adults than those raised under a 12-hour light/dark cycle.

Temperature is one of the most pervasive factors influencing arthropod development. In Drosophila melanogaster temperature-induced developmental plasticity can be beneficial and/or detrimental. Most often lower developmental temperatures reduce growth rates which influence many other physiological factors. For example, development at 25 °C increases walking speed, thermal performance breadth, and territorial success, while development at 18 °C increases body mass, wing size, all of which are tied to fitness. Moreover, developing at certain low temperatures produces proportionally large wings which improve flight and reproductive performance at similarly low temperatures (See acclimation).

While certain effects of developmental temperature, like body size, are irreversible in ectotherms, others can be reversible. When Drosophila melanogaster develop at cold temperatures they will have greater cold tolerance, but if cold-reared flies are maintained at warmer temperatures their cold tolerance decreases and heat tolerance increases over time. Because insects typically only mate in a specific range of temperatures, their cold/heat tolerance is an important trait in maximizing reproductive output.

While the traits described above are expected to manifest similarly across sexes, developmental temperature can also produce sex-specific effects in D. melanogaster adults.

- Females – Ovariole number is significantly affected by developmental temperature in D. melanogaster. Egg size is also affected by developmental temperature, and exacerbated when both parents develop at warm temperatures (See Maternal effect). Under stressful temperatures, these structures will develop to smaller ultimate sizes and decrease a female's reproductive output. Early fecundity (total eggs laid in first 10 days post-eclosion) is maximized when reared at 25 °C (versus 17 °C and 29 °C) regardless of adult temperature. Across a wide range of developmental temperatures, females tend to have greater heat tolerance than males.
- Males – Stressful developmental temperatures will cause sterility in D. melanogaster males; although the upper temperature limit can be increased by maintaining strains at high temperatures (See acclimation). Male sterility can be reversible if adults are returned to an optimal temperature after developing at stressful temperatures. Male flies are smaller and more successful at defending food/oviposition sites when reared at 25 °C versus 18 °C; thus smaller males will have increased mating success and reproductive output.

== Sex determination ==
Drosophila flies have both X and Y chromosomes, as well as autosomes. Unlike humans, the Y chromosome does not confer maleness; rather, it encodes genes necessary for making sperm. Sex is instead determined by the ratio of X chromosomes to autosomes. Furthermore, each cell "decides" whether to be male or female independently of the rest of the organism, resulting in the occasional occurrence of gynandromorphs.

X Chromosomes	Autosomes	Ratio of X:A	Sex
XXXX	AAAA	1	Normal Female
XXX	AAA	1	Normal Female
XXY	AA	1	Normal Female
XXYY	AA	1	Normal Female
XX	AA	1	Normal Female
XY	AA	0.50	Normal Male
X	AA	0.50	Normal Male (sterile)
XXX	AA	1.50	Metafemale
XXXX	AAA	1.33	Metafemale
XX	AAA	0.66	Intersex
X	AAA	0.33	Metamale

Three major genes are involved in determination of Drosophila sex. These are sex-lethal, sisterless, and deadpan. Deadpan is an autosomal gene which inhibits sex-lethal, while sisterless is carried on the X chromosome and inhibits the action of deadpan. An AAX cell has twice as much deadpan as sisterless, so sex-lethal will be inhibited, creating a male. However, an AAXX cell will produce enough sisterless to inhibit the action of deadpan, allowing the sex-lethal gene to be transcribed to create a female.

Later, control by deadpan and sisterless disappears and what becomes important is the form of the sex-lethal gene. A secondary promoter causes transcription in both males and females. Analysis of the cDNA has shown that different forms are expressed in males and females. Sex-lethal has been shown to affect the splicing of its own mRNA. In males, the third exon is included which encodes a stop codon, causing a truncated form to be produced. In the female version, the presence of sex-lethal causes this exon to be missed out; the other seven amino acids are produced as a full peptide chain, again giving a difference between males and females.

Presence or absence of functional sex-lethal proteins now go on to affect the transcription of another protein known as doublesex. In the absence of sex-lethal, doublesex will have the fourth exon removed and be translated up to and including exon 6 (DSX-M[ale]), while in its presence the fourth exon which encodes a stop codon will produce a truncated version of the protein (DSX-F[emale]). DSX-F causes transcription of Yolk proteins 1 and 2 in somatic cells, which will be pumped into the oocyte on its production.

== Immunity ==
The D. melanogaster immune system can be divided into two responses: humoral and cell-mediated. The former is a systemic response mediated in large part through the toll and Imd pathways, which are parallel systems for detecting microbes. Other pathways including the stress response pathways JAK-STAT and P38, nutritional signalling via FOXO, and JNK cell death signalling are all involved in key physiological responses to infection. D. melanogaster has an organ called the "fat body", which is analogous to the human liver. The fat body is the primary secretory organ and produces key immune molecules upon infection, such as serine proteases and antimicrobial peptides (AMPs). AMPs are secreted into the hemolymph and bind infectious bacteria and fungi, killing them by forming pores in their cell walls or inhibiting intracellular processes. The cellular immune response instead refers to the direct activity of blood cells (hemocytes) in Drosophila, which are analogous to mammalian monocytes/macrophages. Hemocytes also possess a significant role in mediating humoral immune responses such as the melanization reaction.

The immune response to infection can involve up to 2,423 genes, or 13.7% of the genome. Although the fly's transcriptional response to microbial challenge is highly specific to individual pathogens, Drosophila differentially expresses a core group of 252 genes upon infection with most bacteria. This core group of genes is associated with gene ontology categories such as antimicrobial response, stress response, secretion, neuron-like, reproduction, and metabolism among others. Drosophila also possesses several immune mechanisms to both shape the microbiota and prevent excessive immune responses upon detection of microbial stimuli. For instance, secreted PGRPs with amidase activity scavenge and degrade immunostimulatory DAP-type PGN in order to block Imd activation.

Unlike mammals, Drosophila have innate immunity but lack an adaptive immune response. However, the core elements of this innate immune response are conserved between humans and fruit flies. As a result, the fruit fly offers a useful model of innate immunity for disentangling genetic interactions of signalling and effector function, as flies do not have to contend with interference of adaptive immune mechanisms that could confuse results. Various genetic tools, protocols, and assays make Drosophila a classical model for studying the innate immune system, which has even included immune research on the international space station.

=== JAK-STAT signalling ===
Multiple elements of the Drosophila JAK-STAT signalling pathway bear direct homology to human JAK-STAT pathway genes. JAK-STAT signalling is induced upon various organismal stresses such as heat stress, dehydration, or infection. JAK-STAT induction leads to the production of a number of stress response proteins including Thioester-containing proteins (TEPs), Turandots, and the putative antimicrobial peptide Listericin. The mechanisms through which many of these proteins act is still under investigation. For instance, the TEPs appear to promote phagocytosis of Gram-positive bacteria and the induction of the toll pathway. As a consequence, flies lacking TEPs are susceptible to infection by toll pathway challenges.

Drosophila hemocytes (green) engulfing Escherichia coli bacteria (red)

=== The cellular response to infection ===
Circulating hemocytes are key regulators of infection. This has been demonstrated both through genetic tools to generate flies lacking hemocytes, or through injecting microglass beads or lipid droplets that saturate hemocyte ability to phagocytose a secondary infection. Flies treated like this fail to phagocytose bacteria upon infection, and are correspondingly susceptible to infection. These hemocytes derive from two waves of hematopoiesis, one occurring in the early embryo and one occurring during development from larva to adult. However Drosophila hemocytes do not renew over the adult lifespan, and so the fly has a finite number of hemocytes that decrease over the course of its lifespan. Hemocytes are also involved in regulating cell-cycle events and apoptosis of aberrant tissue (e.g. cancerous cells) by producing Eiger, a tumor necrosis factor signalling molecule that promotes JNK signalling and ultimately cell death and apoptosis.

== Neurobiology and behavior ==
In 1971, Ron Konopka and Seymour Benzer published "Clock mutants of Drosophila melanogaster", a paper describing the first mutations that affected an animal's behavior. Since then, Benzer and others have used behavioral screens to isolate genes involved in vision, olfaction, audition, learning/memory, courtship, pain, aggression, grooming, and other processes, such as longevity.

=== Circadian rhythm ===
Wild-type flies show an activity rhythm with a frequency of about a day (24 hours). Benzer and others found mutants with faster and slower rhythms, as well as broken rhythms—flies that move and rest in random spurts. Work over the following 30 years has shown that these mutations (and others like them) affect a group of genes and their products that form a biochemical or biological clock. This clock is found in a wide range of fly cells, but the clock-bearing cells that control activity are several dozen neurons in the fly's central brain.

The Nobel Prize in Physiology or Medicine for 2017 was awarded to Jeffrey C. Hall, Michael Rosbash, Michael W. Young for their works using fruit flies in understanding the "molecular mechanisms controlling the circadian rhythm".

=== Courtship ===
Following the pioneering work of Alfred Henry Sturtevant and others, Benzer and colleagues used sexual mosaics to develop a novel fate mapping technique. This technique made it possible to assign a particular characteristic to a specific anatomical location. For example, this technique showed that male courtship behavior is controlled by the brain. Mosaic fate mapping also provided the first indication of the existence of pheromones in this species. In addition to sex specific pheromones, male flies use multiple sensory modalities to initiate and continue courtship behaviors. Male flies tap a potential mate to sample pheromones through taste resceptors on their front legs. They also vibrate their wings to produce species-specific courtship songs. Female flies can reject male flies by extruding their ovipositor or kicking.

Understanding of the neural circuitry for male sexual behaviors has progressed largely due to the identification of the sexually dimorphic transcription factor, Fruitless. Fruitless expression helps define the sex-specific neurons involved in both sensory perception of conspecific flies and motor outputs that drive courtship and copulatory behaviors.

=== Learning and memory ===
The first learning and memory mutants (dunce, rutabaga, etc.) were isolated by William "Chip" Quinn while in Benzer's lab, and were eventually shown to encode components of an intracellular signaling pathway involving cyclic AMP, protein kinase A, and a transcription factor known as CREB. These molecules were shown to be also involved in synaptic plasticity in Aplysia and mammals.

The initial report by William Quinn et al. described a basic conditioned preference assay. Over the next decade, the assay evolved into the classical olfactory conditioning paradigm in the T-maze: ~100 flies in a vial are connected to a short hallway that splits in two directions, a T-maze. On either end of the T-maze are two odors that are initially neutral, i.e. flies do not show preference for one odor or the other. The assay involves counting the number of flies in each side of the T-maze corridor. Before training half of the flies, on average, will before in each end. During training, the flies also encounter a stimulus in one of the two ends, typically either a sugar reward or an electric shock. After training, flies will show a preference for one odor or another. The two odors are referred to as the conditioned stimulus (CS), and the reward is the unconditioned stimulus (US).

The T-maze assay was used to show where in the fly brain the association is made between the unconditioned stimulus and the conditioned stimulus. Olfactory sensory information is carried by antennal lobe projection neurons to the Kenyon cells of the mushroom body of the fly brain. Kenyon cells synapse onto output neurons of the mushroom body, which then are thought to control stereotyped behaviors. The intracellular signaling cAMP-dependent pathways operate at Kenyon cell-to-mushroom body output neurons to depress the strength of the KC input to MBONs, thus changing the behavior evoked by the stimulus.

=== Sensory systems ===
==== Vision ====
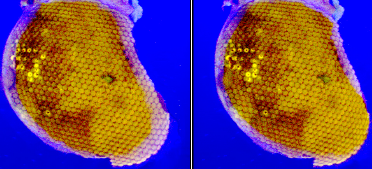
Stereo images of the eye

The compound eye of the fruit fly contains 760 unit eyes or ommatidia, and are one of the most advanced among insects. Each ommatidium contains eight photoreceptor cells (R1-8), support cells, pigment cells, and a cornea. Wild-type flies have reddish pigment cells, which serve to absorb excess blue light so the fly is not blinded by ambient light. Eye color genes regulate cellular vesicular transport. The enzymes needed for pigment synthesis are then transported to the cell's pigment granule, which holds pigment precursor molecules.

Each photoreceptor cell consists of two main sections, the cell body and the rhabdomere. The cell body contains the nucleus, while the 100-μm-long rhabdomere is made up of toothbrush-like stacks of membrane called microvilli. Each microvillus is 1–2 μm in length and about 60 nm in diameter. The membrane of the rhabdomere is packed with about 100 million opsin molecules, the visual protein that absorbs light. The other visual proteins are also tightly packed into the microvilli, leaving little room for cytoplasm.

About two-thirds of the Drosophila brain is dedicated to visual processing. Although the spatial resolution of their vision is significantly worse than that of humans, their temporal resolution is around 10 times better.

==== Olfaction ====
Flies use a modified version of Bloom filters to detect novelty of odors, with additional features including similarity of novel odor to that of previously experienced examples, and time elapsed since previous experience of the same odor.

=== Locomotion ===
==== Terrestrial locomotion ====
High-speed, multi-view recording of a freely moving fly. Colored circles represent 50 different body landmarks, tracked with JARVIS-HybridNet.

Like many other insects, Drosophila typically move using a tripod gait: three of the legs swing together while the other three remain stationary. Specifically, the middle leg moves in phase with the contralateral front and hind legs. Variability around the tripod configuration exists along a continuum, with coordination strength between legs of the same tripod increasing with speed. This means that at fast speeds, the leg coordination is mostly tripod (three legs in stance), but at slower speeds, flies are more likely to have four (tetrapod) or five legs in stance (wave). These smooth transitions may help to optimize static stability. Furthermore, flies do not walk, but rather use running-like biomechanics across their whole speed range. Because flies are so small, inertial forces are negligible compared with the elastic forces of their muscles and joints or the viscous forces of the surrounding air.

==== Flight ====
Flies fly via straight sequences of movement interspersed by rapid turns called saccades. During these turns, a fly is able to rotate 90 degrees in less than 50 milliseconds.

Characteristics of Drosophila flight may be dominated by the viscosity of the air, rather than the inertia of the fly body, but the opposite case with inertia as the dominant force may occur. However, subsequent work showed that while the viscous effects on the insect body during flight may be negligible, the aerodynamic forces on the wings themselves actually cause fruit flies' turns to be damped viscously.

=== Connectome ===
Drosophila is one of the few animals (C. elegans being another) where detailed neural circuits (connectomes) of the brain and nerve cord are available.

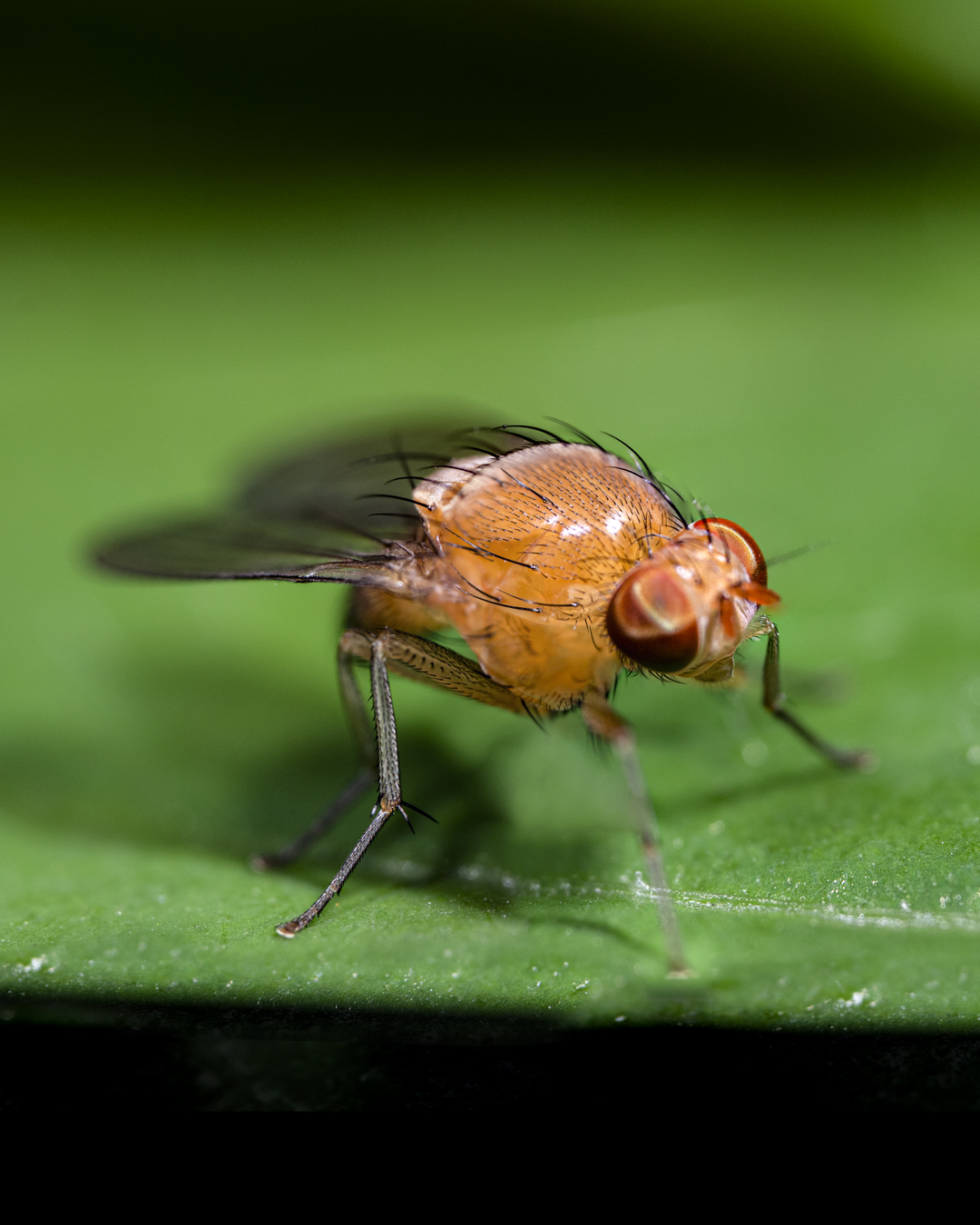

The larval brain and nerve cord consist of 3,016 neurons and 548,000 synapses. The Drosophila adult central nervous system (brain plus ventral nerve cord) has been reconstructed in both the male and the female and contains around 160,000 neurons and over 200 million synapses. These datasets allow scientists to generate testable hypotheses about how the brain processes information and gives rise to behavior.

== Misconceptions ==
Drosophila is often referred to as a pest due to its tendency to live in human settlements where fermenting fruit is found. Flies may collect in homes, restaurants, stores, and other locations. The name and behavior of this species of fly have led to the misconception in Australia and elsewhere that it is a biological security risk. While other "fruit fly" species do pose a risk, D. melanogaster is simply attracted to fruit that is already rotting; it does not cause the fruit to rot.

== See also ==
- Animal testing on invertebrates
- Microbiome in the Drosophila gut
- Eating behavior in Insects (Measurement)
- Fruit flies in space
- Genetically modified insect
- Gynandromorphism
- JETLAG gene
- List of Drosophila databases
- Spätzle (gene)
- Time flies like an arrow; fruit flies like a banana
- Transgenesis
- Zebrafish – another widely-used model organism in scientific research
- Enhancer-FACS-seq
