= Balanced lethal systems =

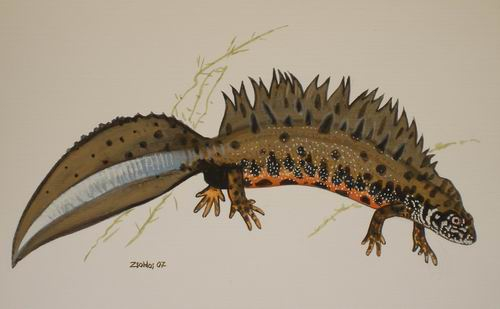
Danube crested newt (Triturus dobrogicus)

In evolutionary biology, a balanced lethal system is a situation where recessive lethal alleles are present on two homologous chromosomes. Each of the chromosomes in such a pair carries a different lethal allele, which is compensated for by the functioning allele on the other chromosome. Since both these lethal alleles end up in the gametes in the same frequency as the functioning alleles, half of the offspring, the homozygotes, receive two copies of a lethal allele and therefore die during development. In such systems, only the heterozygotes survive.

Balanced lethal systems appear to pose a challenge to evolutionary theory, since a system so wasteful should be rapidly eliminated through natural selection and recombination. Instead, it has become fixed in various species all over the tree of life.

== Mechanism ==
The exact mechanism behind balanced lethal systems remains unknown. Prior to the availability of efficient DNA sequencing methods, it was already known that the lethality in such a system was caused by homozygosity of a certain chromosome pair.

One theory is that, in the case of the Triturus genus, the balanced lethal system is a remnant of an ancient sex-determination system. One of the chromosomes of the pair that contains the system is longer than the other, which is also the case for the actual sex chromosomes. In this theory, deleterious mutations accumulated on the non-recombining part of the Y-chromosome (Muller's ratchet). Then, two distinct Y-chromosomes, both with different lethal mutations, co-segregated in a population. Since sex-determination in many cold-blooded vertebrates is potentially dependent on temperature, a shift away from chromosomal sex determination occurred. This system favoured the sex reversal of females, which eventually led to the loss of the original X-chromosome. A mutation on another chromosome later restored the even sex ratio, and gave rise to a new male-heterogametic system. A major restriction for this theory is that it could only evolve in species where temperature-dependent sex-reversal is possible. Since balanced lethal systems are found in many species where this is not the case, this theory does not provide a general explanation for how such a system evolved.

Another theory is that balanced lethal systems are collapsed supergenes. Supergenes are linked genes that are inherited as a single unit. Genes can only be inherited together when recombination is suppressed, for example when selection favors certain allelic combinations. The lack of recombination can lead to the accumulation of mutations in both supergene clusters and this could generate a feedback loop: when natural selection favours heterozygotes, few homozygotes reproduce. This lack of reproduction leads to the accumulation of deleterious alleles. When lethal mutations become fixed on both supergene alleles, homozygotes are no longer viable, resulting in a balanced lethal system.

== Prevalence ==
A well known balanced lethal system is the one fixed in the genus Triturus (containing the crested and the marbled newts). Each of the homologous chromosomes of pair 1 (1A and 1B) has a different recessive deleterious allele on a non-recombining section of the chromosome. Therefore, only heterozygotes are viable since these deleterious alleles are compensated for by the functioning allele on the other homologue. As a result half of all offspring stop growing and die during early development.

The offspring of Triturus carnifex for example, have either a viable heterozygous genotype (1A/1B) or one of the homozygous embryonic lethal genotypes: fat-tailed (1A/1A) or slim-tailed (1B/1B).

== See also ==
- Balancer chromosome
- Recessive lethals
- Northern crested newt
- Hermann Joseph Muller
- Linkage disequilibrium
