= Margaret Bastock =

British biologist

- Born: 22 March 1920; Warwick, Warwickshire, England
- Died: 10 June 1982 (aged 62); Charminster, Dorset, England
- Education: Oxford University
- Known for: Genetic research, which established that genes affect behaviour
- Spouse: Aubrey Manning
- Scientific career
- Fields: Genetics and Zoology
- Workplaces: Oxford University
- Doctoral advisor: Niko Tinbergen

Margaret Bastock Manning (22 March 1920 – 10 June 1982) was an English zoologist and geneticist. She carried out influential work in the 1950s, establishing links between genes and behaviour.

== Life and career ==
Margaret Bastock was born on 22 March 1920 in Warwick, Warwickshire, England to Andrew John Bastock and Frances Louise Cooke. She began a degree in zoology at Oxford University, but her studies were interrupted by the outbreak of the Second World War, 1939. During the war she worked for the BBC, but afterwards she returned to Oxford and completed her undergraduate studies.

Bastock then became a member of St Anne's College, Oxford and studied motivational drives in animal behaviour, working with Desmond Morris. In 1950 she began working towards her D.Phil. in Nikolaas Tinbergen's laboratory. She studied the relationship between behaviour, genetics and evolution using the fruit fly Drosophila melanogaster. In 1956, she published the first evidence that a single gene could change behaviour. She studied a mutation called yellow in Drosophila and showed that this, or a closely linked gene, affected the fly's mating behaviour.

== Personal life and death ==
After completing her D.Phil., Bastock continued working on courtship behaviour and wrote a textbook on the subject. She collaborated with another student of Tinbergen, Aubrey Manning, whom she married in 1959. Bastock moved to Edinburgh with Manning in the 1960s and they had two sons. Bastock continued to work in science, studying child development and aggressive behaviour. She died of cancer on 10 June 1982 in Charminster, Dorset, aged 62.

== Key publications ==
- “Some comments on conflict and thwarting in animals”. Bastock, M. Morris, D, Moynihan, M. 1953. Behaviour, 6: p. 66-74.
- Courtship: a zoological study. Bastock, M. 1967. London, Heinemann.

== See also ==
- behavior mutation
