= Jet Lag (disambiguation) =

Jet lag is a physiological syndrome.

Jet Lag may also refer to:

== Music ==
- Jet Lag (Premiata Forneria Marconi album), 1977
- Jet Lag (Josiah Wolf album), 2010
- Jet Lag (Milosh album)
- "Jet Lag" (song), a 2011 song by Simple Plan
- Jetlag, initial name of U.S. band D.A.R.K.
- "Jet Lag", a 1974 song by Nazareth, from the album Rampant
- "Jet Lag", a 2004 song by Joss Stone, from the album Mind Body & Soul
- "Jet Lag", a 2008 song by Frank Turner, from the album Love Ire & Song
- "Jet Lag", a 2002 song by Brendan Benson, from the album Lapalco
- "Jet Lag", a 2018 song by Future and Juice Wrld, from the collaborative mixtape Wrld On Drugs

== Other ==
- Jet Lag (film), a 2002 film starring Juliette Binoche and Jean Reno
- Jet Lag: The Game, a travel competition show
- Jetlag Productions, former American animation studio

== See also ==
- Cultural jet lag, cultural disconnection syndrome
- "Jet Lagged", a 1981 song by Smokie
- JETLAG gene, a gene found in some organisms
