= X:A ratio =

The X:A ratio is the ratio between the number of X chromosomes and the number of sets of autosomes in an organism. This ratio is used primarily for determining the sex of some species, such as drosophila flies and the C. elegans nematode. The first use of this ratio for sex determination is ascribed to Victor M. Nigon.

Generally, a 1:1 ratio results in a female and a 1:2 ratio results in a male. When calculating the ratio, Y chromosomes are ignored. For example, for a diploid drosophila that has XX, the ratio is 1:1 (2 Xs to 2 sets of autosomes, since it is a diploid). For a diploid drosophila that has XY, the ratio is 1:2 (1 X to 2 sets of autosomes, since it is diploid). Drosophilla sex chromosome ratio determines the factors it encodes which enhances the synthesis of sxl protein which in turn activates the female specific pathway.

== See also ==
- Drosophila melanogaster § Sex determination
