= Aubrey Manning =

English zoologist and broadcaster (1930–2018)

- Born: Aubrey William George Manning; 24 April 1930; Chiswick, London, England
- Died: 20 October 2018 (aged 88)
- Occupations: Zoologist; Writer; Broadcaster
- Spouses: Margaret Bastock; Joan Herrmann

Aubrey William George Manning, OBE, FRSE, FRSB (24 April 1930 – 20 October 2018), was an English zoologist and broadcaster.

== Early life ==
Manning, the son of William, who worked for the Home and Colonial Stores, and Hilda, was born in Chiswick, but moved with his family to Englefield Green in Surrey when the Second World War broke out, to escape the Blitz.

Manning was educated at Strode's Grammar School in Egham, at University College London, where he studied zoology, and then at Merton College, Oxford, where he completed his DPhil under Niko Tinbergen.

== Career ==
After National Service in the Royal Artillery, he joined the University of Edinburgh as an assistant lecturer in 1956. His main research and teaching interests were on animal behaviour, development and evolution. He was involved with environmental issues since 1966, and with the Centre for Human Ecology since its inception at the University of Edinburgh in 1970. He was Professor of Natural History at the university from 1973 to 1997. In December 1997, a gallery in the Natural History Collection of Edinburgh University was named in his honour on his retirement. He later became Emeritus Professor.

== Honours and public offices ==
Manning was elected Fellow of the Royal Society of Edinburgh (1973), and received an OBE in 1998. He also held honorary doctorates from Université Paul Sabatier in Toulouse, the University of St Andrews, and the Open University. He received the Zoological Society of London Silver Medal in 2003, for public understanding of science.

Among his many posts, he was Chairman of Edinburgh Brook Advisory Centre, Chairman of the Council of the Scottish Wildlife Trust, and a trustee of the National Museums of Scotland and of Project Wallacea. He was President of the Royal Society of Wildlife Trusts from 2005 to 2010, and was patron of Population Matters (formerly known as the Optimum Population Trust).

== Writing and broadcasting ==
Manning wrote An Introduction to Animal Behaviour (1967) published by Cambridge University Press, which is now in its sixth edition (last three editions co-authored with Professor Marian Stamp Dawkins. His television broadcasts included: BBC Two's Earth Story, Landscape Mysteries and Talking Landscapes. His radio broadcasts included The Rules of Life for BBC Radio 4 and the Open University in 2006. He also broadcast five series of Radio 4's Unearthing Mysteries, Sounds of Life and Origins: the Human Connection.

== Personal life ==
In 1959, Manning married zoologist Margaret Bastock (d. 1982), with whom he had two sons. In 1985, he married Joan Herrmann, a child psychotherapist, with whom he had another son.

== Death ==
Manning died on 20 October 2018.

== See also ==
- Human overpopulation

Non-profit organization positions
Preceded by David Bellamy	President of the Wildlife Trusts; 2005–2010	Succeeded by Simon King
