= Behavior mutation =

A behaviour mutation is a genetic mutation that alters genes that control the way in which an organism behaves, causing their behavioural patterns to change.

A mutation is a change or error in the genomic sequence of a cell. It can occur during meiosis or replication of DNA, as well as due to ionizing or UV radiation, transposons, mutagenic chemicals, viruses and a number of other factors. Mutations usually (but not always) result in a change in an organism's fitness. These changes are largely deleterious, having a negative effect on fitness; however, they can also be neutral and even advantageous.

It is theorized that these mutations, along with genetic recombination, are the raw material upon which natural selection can act to form evolutionary processes. This is due to selection's tendency to "pick and choose" mutations which are advantageous and pass them on to an organism's offspring, while discarding deleterious mutations. In asexual lineages, these mutations will always be passed on, causing them to become a crucial factor in whether the lineage will survive or go extinct.

One way that mutations manifest themselves is behaviour mutation. Some examples of this could be variations in mating patterns, increasingly aggressive or passive demeanor, how an individual learns and the way an individual interacts and coordinates with others.

Behaviour mutations have important implications on the nature of the evolution of animal behaviour. They can help us understand how different forms of behaviour evolve, especially behaviour which can seem strange or out of place. In other cases, they can help us understand how important patterns of behaviour were able to arise – on the back of a simple gene mutation. Finally, they can help provide key insight on the nature of speciation events which can occur when a behaviour mutation changes the courtship methods and manner of mating in sexually reproducing species.

== History ==
Ethology, the study of animal behaviour, has been a topic of interest since the 1930s. The pioneers of the field include Dutch biologist Nikolaas Tinbergen and Austrian biologists Karl von Frisch and Konrad Lorenz (the three won the Nobel Prize in Physiology or Medicine in 1973 for their discoveries concerning organization and elicitation of individual and social behaviour patterns). However, the first published demonstration of how a mutation in a single gene could change an organism's behaviour was carried out by Margaret Bastock in 1956, while she was a Ph.D. student working under Tinbergen at Oxford University.

Bastock investigated the yellow mutant of Drosophila melanogaster, the common fruit fly. Upon comparison of courtship rituals in 19 yellow mutants and 19 wild types, wild types were noted to court 92% of the time, while yellow ones courted only 83% of the time. In addition, when the yellow mutants courted it took them noticeably longer than the wild types. Even after significant generations of crossing, the flies homozygous for the "yellow" allele were less successful in mating with wild type females than their heterozygous brothers. These results led Bastock to conclude that the origin of this deficient mating behaviour was the very same mutant gene that caused yellow discolouration.

Bastock's work directly and indirectly influenced a new way of observing behaviour patterns and analyzing them, as well as changed the way we look at the evolution of these behavioural patterns in animals. However, it was not until much later that her work was fully recognized and accredited in further studies on genes influencing animal behaviour. Seymour Benzer worked further on D. melanogaster in the 1960s, focusing on different novel phenotypes such as phototaxis and circadian rhythms. In 1978, J.C. Hall returned to a similar focus on courtship while investigating different mutations. Bastock's work had important consequences for the field of neuroscience as well, spurring the emergence of neurogenetics and a new understanding of how our brains work.

== Notable experiments ==
Behaviour mutations have been studied in a variety of animals, but most commonly in Drosophila melanogaster due to being able to produce large numbers with short generation time as well as a rich diversity of behaviours. Many tests have been used in drosophila by specifying behavioural mutations to further understand the nervous system. In order to understand how behaviour is controlled by the nervous system, it is key to identify the neuronal substrates important for the specific activity studied, as well as to explain how they are incorporated into a functional circuit. Most tests used allowed researchers to directly observe the mutation, such as altering phototaxis or flight-reduction. It was also shown in some experiments that certain mutations affect experience-based behaviour. Behavioural mutation has also been extensively tested in mice.

In one test involving Drosophila, a temperature-sensitive allele of shibire is overexpressed in neuronal subsets using the GAL4/UAS system. The shi gene is used for synaptic vesicle recycling, and a change in the temperature would cause an accelerated and reversible effect on the synaptic transmission of shi expressing neurons. When shi was tested to cholinergic neurons, the flies showed a quick response to the temperature and were paralyzed within two minutes at 30 degrees, which was reversible. When shi was expressed in photoreceptor cell, fly larva showed temporary temperature-dependent blindness. This experiment shows that shi can be expressed in specific neurons to cause temperature-dependent alterations in behaviours. This research will further be helpful in studying the neuronal subsets in the behaviour of intact animals due to the reversible and controlled manner it is performed in.

In more recent studies the Zebrafish ennui mutation was identified from mutagenesis identification for defects in early behaviour. Homozygous ennui embryo swam more slowly than the wild-type but gained normal swimming as it aged. When tested, the motor output of the central nervous system following mechano-sensory stimulation was normal in ennui, which means that the reaction-time and reaction-style were normal to the wild-types and the motoneuron were not affected. The synaptic current at the neuromuscular junction was significantly reduced in ennui which means that the neuromuscular junction was affected. The acetylcholine receptor was significantly reduced in the adult ennui in size as well as localization at the myotome segment borders of fast-twitch muscles. Genetic mosaic analysis revealed that ennui is necessary cell autonomously in muscle fibers for normal synaptic localization of acetylcholine receptors. Also, ennui is very important for agrin function. Ennui is very important in nerve-dependent acetylcholine clustering and the stability of axon growth.

In mice, chemical mutagenesis is a phenotype-driven approach to map the mouse mutant catalogue. The usage of mice in behavioural mutation tests allows scientists to increase our understanding of the genetic basis of mammalian behaviour as well as applying this information to human neurological disorders and psychiatric disorders. SHIRPA is a hierarchal screening protocol that efficiently searches for mutations in muscle and lower motor neuron function, Spinocerebellar, sensory neuron function, neuropsychiatry function, and autonomic nervous system function. The mice are then further tested for defects in parameters that are associated with human psychiatric disorders by using two well-known behaviour tests. The mice are tested for locomotor activity (LMA) as well as prepulse inhibition (PPI). For LMA, mice are placed in cages with beam-splitting monitors that will measure the activity of the mice as well as calculate their habituation to that environment. LMA is recorded in 35-minute time spans in bins of a 5-minute duration. The PPI measures the acoustic startle response, which is an exaggerated response to an unexpected stimulus. The acoustic startle is measured over a range of frequencies and amplitudes to calculate the average response. These tests allow us to detect abnormal behaviours and document them.

== Behavioural degradation under spontaneous mutation accumulation ==
In each generation, the genetic variation within a population increases due to accumulation of mutations and decreases in response to natural selection and genetic drift. Mutation accumulation occurs when mutations of small effect accumulate at certain loci, yielding a large phenotypic effect in the aggregate. Multiple genes may simultaneously affect behavioural traits. Spontaneous mutations arise from sources including errors in DNA replication, spontaneous lesions, and transposable genetic elements in the absence of mutagens. Spontaneous mutations play a central role in the maintenance of genetic variation and persistence of natural population of many organisms.

Evolutionary biologists have used mutation accumulation experiments, in which mutations are allowed to drift to fixation in inbred lines, to study the effect of spontaneous mutations on phenotype character. Phenotypic assays significantly determine whether and how quickly population with accumulated deleterious mutational loads can result in degradation of behavioural responses over time.

Based on laboratory experimental evolution with long-term mutation accumulation (MA) lines of the nematode Caenorhabditis elegans, a team of researchers at the University of Oregon investigated that mutation accumulation of behaviour is capable of generating significant levels of individual variation in ecologically relevant behavioural traits within populations. This variation will be dependent largely on the genetic structure and demographic characteristics of individuals. As a result, small or isolated populations are at high risk of experiencing behavioural degradation. For instance, the rate of mutation for behavioural traits has more effects for behavioural mutation within captive populations and some endangered species. The study of two closely related behavioural traits of the free-living soil nematode C. elegans, chemotaxis and locomotion, indicates that behavioural degradation is a direct source of competitive fitness loss under genomic mutation accumulation.

Raymond B. Huey and his colleagues used the same MA lines method, suggesting that mutation accumulation in Drosophila melanogaster significantly depresses only some behavioural traits. There are several explanations for this. It is possible that traits are influenced only by few loci so that their mutational target is small. Alternatively, the values of the behavioural traits are not maximized by directional selection, but rather are under the influence of stabilizing selection. Since behavioural traits are highly variable, mutation accumulation does not negatively affect all traits equivalently.

=== Sex-ratio behaviour ===
The study of sex allocation has provided some of the most convincing tests of adaptive behaviour. Theory predicts that organisms can adjust the allocation of resources to male and female offspring in response to environmental conditions. Sex ratio behaviour is the sex ratio response of a female in various conditions. Mutation accumulation is important because it is one evolutionary cause that increases variation between individuals in sex-ratio behaviour. For example, female wasps can adjust their offspring sex ratios by choosing whether to fertilize an egg because they are haplodiploid. In particular, female Nasonia vitripennis produce less males when laying eggs alone, and more males when laying eggs on a patch with other females. If female parasitoid wasps produce too few male offspring, then some of the female offspring will remain unmated. On the other hand, if too many sons are produced, then resources are wasted that could have been used to produce more daughters. Females of other strains show no similar conditional sex ratio behaviours. Researchers find that these behaviours are indeed subject to genetic variation. However, genetic variation in natural population is low and it has low heritability as for other fitness-related traits. The observation of this type of behavioural mutation has been argued to pose a problem for sex-ratio theory because the mutations are likely to have decreased fitness.

== Mutations affecting passive/aggressive characteristics ==
Aggression is a survival trait that can be favoured by natural selection in nearly any species. Aggressive individuals can be better able to compete for resources including food, territory and mates, as well as more successful in protecting themselves and their progeny from predators. It can also be energetically costly, and extreme or out of context aggression can be disadvantageous or deleterious, especially in social organisms. Aggression is a complex trait that is regulated by many interacting genes and gene expression is highly variable depending on environment (phenotypic plasticity). Mutations in genes that influence aggressive behaviours can potentially increase aggression or passivity.

=== Neurotransmitters ===
Neurotransmitters, dopamine and serotonin in particular, play an important role in the regulation of aggressive behaviours. Many studies are focused on genes that change the way neurotransmitters interact with receptors within the organism. For example, when individuals suffer from a mutation that causes them to have low levels of serotonin, there is an observed increase in impulsivity and depression With neurotransmitters playing a central role in the development of aggressive behaviour, it follows that many of the gene mutations that have been implicated with aggressive behaviours are involved in the breakdown and/or receipt of neurotransmitters.

Alexis Edwards and her team identified 59 mutations in 57 genes that affected aggressive behaviour in Drosophila melanogaster. The results of their research showed that 32 of the mutants displayed increased aggression and 27 of the mutants displayed less aggression than the control group. Several of the genes examined were found to affect nervous system development and function. Aggression was assessed in this experiment by depriving mutant Drosophila flies from food and then allowing them to defend a limited food source. The number of contest competitions between flies was recorded and compared to non-mutant flies to assess whether the mutants were more or less aggressive than the wild type. Examples of mutations that increase aggression are mutations in the fruitless or dissatisfaction genes which result in observable increases in male-male aggression.

=== Amines ===
Mutations involving amines have been shown to be a prevalent source of changes in behaviour. A point mutation in the structural gene for Monoamine Oxidase A, also known as MAO-A, is responsible for the breakdown of neurotransmitters. This mutation is X-linked, affecting only males, and eliminates the production of MAO-A. Males afflicted with this mutation are prone to mild intellectual disability as well as violent and antisocial behaviour. Another amine affecting aggression is β-alanine which is a bioamine neurotransmitter that has been implicated in Drosophila aggression. A mutation known as the black mutation causes reduced levels of β-alanine and results in less reactive flies than the wild type.

=== Testosterone ===
In nearly all species, there is an obvious disequilibrium between frequency and severity of aggression in males versus females. Males are almost always the more aggressive sex and there are genetic differences that back up this observation. A common explanation for this phenomenon is the higher testosterone levels in males. Testosterone levels have a direct effect on neurotransmitter functioning contributing to physical aggression. Mutations affecting neurotransmitters, as stated above, are the dominant cause of changes in aggressive behaviour. Another contributor to the unequal male-female aggression ratio are the sex-linked gene mutations that affect only male behaviour, such as MAO-A mentioned above. These mutations could be the reason why males are nearly always more aggressive than females, although, testosterone levels are a much more feasible explanation.

Other evolutionary and genetic explanations of violent behaviour include: dopamine receptors mutations, DRD2 and DRD4, that, when mutate simultaneously, are hypothesized to cause personality disorders, low serotonin levels increasing irritability and gloom and the effects of testosterone on neurotransmitter functioning to explain the increased occurrence of aggression in males.

== Effects of mutations on mating ==
Behavioural mutations play a detrimental part towards the genomes of many species, however, they can greatly affect the outcome of mating; affecting the success of fitness, how many offspring will arise and the likelihood that the male will actually procreate. When mutations affect the mating habits of species, different traits that would otherwise benefit the species procreating are compromised.

A couple chemicals that are altered from mutation and have a great impact on mating, are dopamine and serotonin. Each of these chemicals either has a reaction to how the animal acts, or how the species body is formed to benefit their mating success. An example of a mutation in serotonin was found in a species of Nematodes. The serotonin caused their tails to curl during mating, when the mutation occurred the tails did not curl. Without the curling of the tail the nematode was unlikely to find the hermaphrodites sex organs to procreate, and results in less of that nematodes sperm being spread to other offspring. Another example is when the D1 dopamine receptor has a mutation on it; the arousal of a Drosophila melanogaster is increased, which also increases the courtship of the animal.

One example of a study was found in the 'yellow' D.melanogaster, the mating of these males was only beneficial when it was dark outside, or when they were in a dark environment. The mutation is not yet known why it occurs this way, but studies have mentioned that the females of this fly species may be turned off by the certain colour of the mutated fly, and therefore in the dark the female is less likely to tell what colour this fly is.

A beneficial component of a mutation in the behaviour of a mating D. melanogaster, was when the mutation caused the male to have a longer courtship time period. The flies that had a longer courtship had a tendency to have a higher probability of procreating. This means that the fly that took longer to actually initiate the courtship with the female fly, was more likely to be successful with the female successfully accepting the male.
