= Earth Story =

- Genre: Geology documentary
- Narrated by: Aubrey Manning
- Country of origin: United Kingdom
- Original language: English
- No. of series: 1
- No. of episodes: 8

Production
- Executive producer: Richard Reisz
- Running time: 50 minutes

Original release
- Network: BBC Two
- Release: 1 November – 27 December 1998

Earth Story is a 1998 documentary series on geology, co-produced by the BBC and The Learning Channel. Produced by David Sington, the series was narrated by Aubrey Manning.

A number of filming locations were used around the world including Alaska, India, and Barbados.

== Episodes ==
A total of eight episodes were produced with each episode having a runtime of 50 minutes.

1. The Time Travellers (1 November 1998)
2. The Deep (8 November 1998)
3. Ring of Fire (15 November 1998)
4. Journey to the Centre of the Earth (22 November 1998)
5. The Roof of the World (6 December 1998)
6. The Big Freeze (13 December 1998)
7. The Living Earth (20 December 1998)
8. A World Apart (27 December 1998)

== Merchandise ==
A two-disc DVD of the series was released on 7 August 2006.

A book entitled Earth Story: The Shaping of Our World (ISBN 978-0563387992) was written by Simon Lamb and David Sington. It contains 240 pages and was released on 29 October 1998.

== See also ==
- Earth: The Power of the Planet
- How the Earth Was Made
