= Pyrimidodiazepine synthase =

pyrimidodiazepine synthase

Identifiers
- EC no.: 1.5.4.1
- CAS no.: 93586-06-2

Databases
- IntEnz: IntEnz view
- BRENDA: BRENDA entry
- ExPASy: NiceZyme view
- KEGG: KEGG entry
- MetaCyc: metabolic pathway
- PRIAM: profile
- PDB structures: RCSB PDB PDBe PDBsum
- Gene Ontology: AmiGO / QuickGO
Search
- PMC: articles
- PubMed: articles
- NCBI: proteins

In enzymology, a pyrimidodiazepine synthase (EC 1.5.4.1) is an enzyme that catalyzes the chemical reaction

a pyrimidodiazepine + glutathione disulfide + H_{2}O $\rightleftharpoons$ 6-pyruvoyltetrahydropterin + 2 glutathione

The 3 substrates of this enzyme are pyrimidodiazepine, glutathione disulfide, and H_{2}O, whereas its two products are 6-pyruvoyltetrahydropterin and glutathione.

This enzyme belongs to the family of oxidoreductases, specifically those acting on the CH-NH group of donors with a disulfide as acceptor. The systematic name of this enzyme class is pyrimidodiazepine:glutathione-disulfide oxidoreductase (ring-opening, cyclizing). Other names in common use include PDA synthase, pyrimidodiazepine:oxidized-glutathione oxidoreductase (ring-opening,, and cyclizing). This enzyme participates in glutathione metabolism.
