= William Quinn =

William Quinn may refer to:

- Bill Quinn (1912-1994), American film actor
- Liam Quinn (born 1949), a.k.a. William Quinn, member of the Provisional IRA
- William Quinn (actor) (1884–1965), Canadian film and stage actor
- William F. Quinn (1919–2006), governor of Hawaii
- William J. Quinn (1883–1963), chief of police in San Francisco, California
- William John Quinn (1911–2015), railroad executive
- William P. Quinn (1900–1978), Garda Commissioner
- William Paul Quinn (1788–1873), bishop of the African Methodist Episcopal Church
- William Wilson Quinn (1907–2000), Chevalier Lieutenant General, commanding general of the Seventh United States Army
