= Balancer chromosome =

Type of genetically engineered chromosome

Balancer chromosomes (or simply balancers) are a type of genetically engineered chromosome used in laboratory biology for the maintenance of recessive lethal (or sterile) mutations within living organisms without interference from natural selection. Since such mutations are viable only in heterozygotes, they cannot be stably maintained through successive generations and therefore continually lead to the production of wild-type organisms, which can be prevented by replacing the homologous wild-type chromosome with a balancer. In this capacity, balancers are crucial for genetics research on model organisms such as Drosophila melanogaster, the common fruit fly, for which stocks cannot be archived (e.g. frozen). They can also be used in forward genetics screens to specifically identify recessive lethal (or sterile) mutations. For that reason, balancers are also used in other model organisms, most notably the nematode worm Caenorhabditis elegans and the mouse.

Typical balancer chromosomes are designed to (1) carry recessive lethal mutations themselves, eliminating homozygotes which do not carry the desired mutation; (2) suppress meiotic recombination with their homologs, which prevents de novo creation of wild-type chromosomes; and (3) carry dominant genetic markers, which can help identify rare recombinants and are useful for screening purposes.

== History ==
Balancer chromosomes were first used in the fruit fly by Hermann Muller, who pioneered the use of radiation for organismal mutagenesis.

In the modern usage of balancer chromosomes, random mutations are first induced by exposing living organisms with otherwise normal chromosomes to substances which cause DNA damage; in flies and nematodes, this usually occurs by feeding larvae ethyl methanesulfonate (EMS). The DNA-damaged larvae (or the adults into which they develop) are then screened for mutations. When a phenotype of interest is observed, the line expressing the mutation is crossed with another line containing balancer chromosomes in order to maintain their lineage. In one instance, balancers were used to genetically screen a population of Caenorhabditis elegans. By this point in time, scientists had already realized the benefits of being able to genetically screen populations of organisms for genetic study. Equally as important, they also realized that they could limit crossing over in these populations as well as give them very consistent genetic compositions.

The use of balancer chromosomes has since evolved into a well known and widely used method for genetic screening of model organisms. They are even being used to investigate the role of heterochromatin packing and the effect it has on genes, as well as studies of the effects that telomeres have on gene silencing.

== Mechanism ==
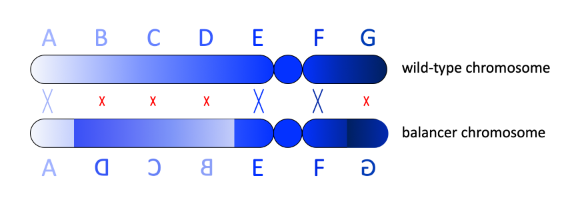
A balancer chromosome contains large inversions ([B,C,D] and [G]). Normal genetic recombination (blue X) is suppressed (red X) at these sites.

In diploid organisms, mutations without recessive lethal (or sterile) phenotypes can simply be bred to homozygosity and maintained stably and indefinitely by crossing homozygotes. However, homozygotes for recessive lethal mutations are by definition non-viable, because the presence of the recessive lethal allele on both chromosomal homologs causes the organism to die early in development; an organism that is homozygous for a recessive mutation that causes sterility yields essentially the same result (i.e. its genetic material cannot be passed on to progeny, even if the sterile individual itself survives to maturity). This problem forces geneticists wanting to study recessive lethal/sterile mutations to maintain the mutation in heterozygous organisms instead (in which a chromosome containing a recessive lethal/sterile mutation is complemented by a homolog that functions as wild-type at the same locus, allowing the organism to survive and reproduce more or less normally).

Crosses between heterozygotes yield wild-type organisms in addition to heterozygotes and the non-viable homozygotes. To maintain a purely heterozygous line, wild-type offspring must be identified and prevented from mating. This can be prohibitively resource-intensive, especially if long-term maintenance of the recessive mutation is the goal.

Substituting a balancer chromosome for the wild-type homolog of the chromosome carrying the recessive mutation prevents the establishment of wild-type organisms in various ways. First, a balancer carries its own independent recessive lethal mutation, which makes the organism non-viable if two copies of balancer are inherited (i.e. no copy of the desired mutation). However, recombination between the balancer and the homolog containing the mutated allele may also result in the de novo creation of a wild-type chromosome. To suppress recombination, balancers usually harbor multiple, nested chromosomal inversions so that synapsis between the homologous chromosomes is disrupted. If crossing over does occur, it is often unbalanced, with each resulting chromatid lacking some genes and carrying two copies of others. The process can also lead to dicentric or acentric chromosomes (chromosomes with two centromeres or no centromere), which are inherently unstable and usually end up breaking up and mutating or being lost during subsequent mitosis. All of these outcomes are very likely to be lethal.

Finally, flies with balancer chromosomes are easily identified by genetic marker mutations. For example, curly wings or stubbled hair. These phenotypes allow researchers to easily recognize flies that carry the balancer. In the unlikely case of viable recombination, the marker may be lost, thus alerting researchers to the event.

Importantly, suppression of recombination by nested inversions only occurs at the inverted intervals, while other regions (usually peri-centromeric and sub-telomeric regions) are free to recombine. Likewise, if the desired mutation is in the same locus as the balancer's recessive lethal mutation (i.e. is in strong linkage disequilibrium with it), recombination resulting in a wild-type chromosome is very unlikely, regardless of recombination suppressive inversions.

In addition to simply maintaining an isolated recessive lethal (or sterile) mutation, balancer chromosomes are also useful in forward genetic screens to identify such mutations. In such screens randomly mutagenized organisms carrying a balancer are crossed with each other. Offspring that carry the balancer, identified by the dominant marker, can be crossed with littermates. Any such cross that does not produce marker-negative animals is likely the result of a recessive lethal mutation in the non-balancer chromosome. Of course, only the genomic interval covered by the inversions in the balancer can be screened in this way, with recessive lethal mutations in other intervals and on other chromosomes being lost.

== Naming convention in Drosophila ==
Balancer chromosomes are named for the chromosome they serve to stabilize and for the phenotypic or genetic marker the balancer carries. The naming of balancer chromosomes in D. melanogaster has been standardized as follows: the first letter of the chromosome's name represents the number of the chromosome it stabilizes. F stands for the first chromosome, S for second, and T for third. The small fourth chromosome does not undergo recombination and therefore does not require balancing. This letter is then followed by an M for "multiply inverted". The M is followed by a number to distinguish balancers of the same chromosome. Additionally, the genetic marker or markers within the balancer are listed after the name and separated by a comma. Generally, mutations with easily observable dominant phenotypic traits that are often homozygous lethal are used to ensure that all progeny are heterozygous. For example, the commonly used TM3, Sb balancer stabilizes the third chromosome and carries a mutant Sb ("stubble") gene as a dominant marker. All flies containing the TM3, Sb balancer will have shortened or stubbly hairs on the back of their abdomens, which are easily seen when viewed through a microscope. The 3 distinguishes this balancer from other third-chromosome balancers such as TM1 and TM2.

A line is said to be "double-balanced" if it is heterozygous for two different balancer chromosomes (for example, TM6, Tb/TM3, Ser) on one chromosome and a homozygous-lethal, heterozygous-visible mutant on the other, wild-type chromosome (for example, D/TM3, Ser). Most balancer chromosomes also carry a recessive allele such as the "ebony" mutation that is only manifest in these stocks with two balancer chromosomes. Such stocks are often used to provide sources of easily traceable traits when breeding two different lines together, so that the correct progeny of each cross can be selected. Stocks double-balanced at both the second and third chromosomes in Drosophila are widely available from fly stock repositories.

== Commonly used balancer chromosomes in Drosophila ==
Chromosome	Balancer name	Common Markers	Chromosomal rearrangement (cytology)
X	FM6	Bar (B)	(20B - 20B) | 15E - 20A | 15D - 11F4 | (4E - 4E) | 3C - 4D7 | 11F2 - 4F | 3C - 1B3 | 20D1 - 1Rt
X	FM7a	Bar (B)	20F - 20A | 15D - 20A | 15D - 11F4 | 4E1 - 11F2 | 4D7 - 1B3 | 1Rt
2	CyO	Curly (Cy)	33F5 - 30F | 50D1 - 58A4 | 42A2 - 34A1 | 22D2 - 30E | 50C10 - 42A3 | 58B1 - 2Rt
2	SM6a	Curly (Cy)	60B - 58B1 | 42A3 - 50C10 | 30E - 22D | 34A1 - 42A2 | 58A4 - 50D1 | 30F - 33F5 | 22D1 - 22B1 | 60C - 2Rt
3	TM2	Ultrabithorax (Ubx)	96B - 93B | 89D - 74 | 61C - 74 | 89E - 93B | 96A - 3Rt
3	TM3	Stubble (Sb) and Serrate (Ser)	85E - 79E | 100C - 100F2 | 92D1 - 85E | 65E - 71C | 94D - 93A | 76C - 71C | 94F - 100C | 79E - 76C | 93A - 92E1 | 100F3 - 3Rt
3	TM6B	Tubby (Tb) and Humeral (Hu)	87B2 - 86C8 | 84F2 - 86C7 | 84B2 - 84F2 | 84B2 - 75C | 94A - 100F2 | 92D1 - 87B4 | 61A2 - 63B8 | 72E1 - 63B11 | 72E2 - 75C | 94A - 92E1 | 100F3 - 3Rt

== Important scientific contributions using balancer chromosomes ==
Balancer chromosomes give geneticists a reliable method for genetically screening organisms for a specific mutation and maintaining that mutation consistently in subsequent generations. A new technique using balancer chromosomes is explored in the paper "The Autosomal Flp-Dfs Technique for Generating Germline Mosaics in Drosophila Melanogaster", which showed for the first time that it is possible to screen for a recessive mutation that only shows a phenotype when homozygous. Using old balancer chromosome methods, genetic screening only allowed for the selection of heterozygous dominant mutations. This experiment uses clonal screening to detect homozygous individuals and keep them in a constant line. They achieved this by using the FLP recombinase gene, isolated from yeast, which causes large chromosomal inversions. Through trial and error they found that the chromosomes could be recombined such that each had the recessive mutation while the other half contained half of a balancer chromosome with a physical marker and a lethal recessive. The other homolog did not contain the lethal recessive in the lines that survived. Figure one in the paper illustrates the screen. This new technique allowed recessive screening in 95% of the Drosophila genome. It also greatly improved yields in germ-line mutations.

Another published paper that employed the use of balancer chromosomes is "Inhibition of RNA Interference and Modulation of Transposable Element Expression by Cell Death in Drosophila". This paper demonstrates the power of balancer chromosomes and what can be accomplished with genetically stable lines. A line was established that exhibited low levels of cell death and was named EGFPir hs-hid. When the RNAi levels were analyzed, the authors found interesting results in the cells undergoing low levels of cell death and the surrounding cells in the tissue. They found that these cells would shut down their RNAi mechanism via maintaining RNA in a double-stranded state; i.e. if RNA remains in a double-stranded state, then the RNAi mechanism of gene silencing is effectively disabled.

The authors speculated that this response was an evolutionary trend toward a redundant immune response against RNA viruses. If one cell is already undergoing cell death to attempt to stop the spread of a virus, then the RNAi immune response has been ineffective. This causes another immune response that attempts to stop the virus, which is binding double-stranded RNA and keeping it double-stranded so that it cannot be transcribed into viral proteins. The precise mechanism by which double-stranded RNA is maintained is not known.
