= Metafemale =

Type of Drosophila fruit fly

A metafemale (or superfemale) is a low viability Drosophila fruit fly with a female phenotype in which the ratio of X chromosomes to sets of autosomes (A) exceeds 1.0. For example: a fly with one X chromosome and two sets of autosomes is a normal male, a fly with two X chromosomes and two sets of autosomes is a normal female, and a fly with three X chromosomes and two sets of autosomes (or four X chromosomes and three sets of autosomes) is a metafemale.

American geneticist Calvin Bridges, who discovered the genic balance sex-determination system in Drosophila in 1921, used the terms "superfemale" and "supermale". German-American geneticist Curt Stern proposed the alternative terms "metafemale" and "metamale" in 1959.
