= JETLAG gene =

Gene in drosophila and other insects

Identifiers
- Organism: D. melanogaster and other insects
- Symbol: JET
- Alt. symbols: CG8873; Dmel\CG8873; FBXL15; Jet; JET; JETLAG
- HomoloGene: 44220
- RefSeq (mRNA): NM_001042867
- RefSeq (Prot): NP_001036332
- UniProt: Q0E8T8

Other data
- Chromosome: 2L: 4.95 - 4.95 Mb
Search for
- Structures: Swiss-model
- Domains: InterPro

Jet or Jetlag is a gene discovered in Drosophila and other insects. They are a part of the SCF (SKP1–Cullin1–F-box protein) family of ubiquitin ligases that plays a huge role in the circadian pathway by controlling the degradation of TIM, a circadian regulatory protein. The gene plays an important role in resetting the circadian clock by transmitting light from CRY (circadian photoreceptor) to TIM (a clock protein). Jetlag mutants have been found to impede re-entrainment due to significantly reduced ability to degrade TIM. The F-box protein of the FBXL family named FBXL15 is JET's mammalian homolog.

== Structure ==
The Jetlag gene is located on the left arm of the second chromosome at NT_033779.5. In Drosophila (melanogaster), the coding region of the gene has a length of 1241 nucleotides. A 313 amino acid protein is transcribed from this gene. Jetlag has 2 exons.

Jetlag interacts antagonistically with DYSCHRONIC-SLOWPOKE (DYSC) and regulates synaptic development to promote circadian output and influence morning and evening activity in Drosophila. It also interacts with Bromodomain And WD Repeat Domain Containing 3 (BRWD3) and SKP1-related A (SkpA). Jetlag proteins are members of the SCF complex (SKP1–Cullin1–F-box protein) family of ubiquitin ligases that controls the degradation of circadian clock protein, TIM, through ubiquitin-proteasome pathway. Jetlag has a leucine-rich domain that can be recruited by CRY protein when CRY is interacting with TIM. Then, Jetlag brings the SCF E3 ubiquitin ligase, promoting polyubiquitination and degradation of TIM.

Jetlag gene has two kinds of alleles. A phenylalanine-to-isoleucine mutation in a leucine-rich region is referred to as "common", or "c" allele. In an adjacent leucine-rich region, a serine-to-leucine substitution is referred to as "rare", or "r" allele. The two alleles do not complement each other, meaning that they result in a mutant phenotype.

== Function ==
Mutations in the Jetlag gene can result in reduced light sensitivity of the circadian clock in fruit flies. Mutant flies with Jetlag mutations show rhythmic behavior in constant light, reduced phase shifts in response to light pulses, and reduced light-dependent degradation of TIM. They can still be entrained to light:dark (LD) cycles, although re-entrainment to a new schedule takes longer. The expression of JET, along with the circadian photoreceptor cryptochrome (CRY), confers light-dependent degradation onto TIM, thereby reconstituting the acute response of the circadian clock to light in a cell culture system. The reduced light sensitivity of jet mutants is similar to that of cry mutants in flies, and both of them suggest a defect in circadian photoreception.

In fruit flies, short light exposure can significantly shift the phase of circadian behavior, which is mediated by both Jetlag and interactions between circadian neurons. In fruit fly's neurons, there are two groups of circadian oscillator - the morning (M) and the evening (E). JET causes rapid TIM degradation cell autonomously in M and E, but also nonautonomously in E when expressed in M. Therefore, under light stimulation, the M oscillators can communicate with the E ocsillators.

Jetlag also plays an important role in the regulation of synaptic development at the neuromuscular junction in Drosophila (melanogaster) larvae. Jetlag and another gene called DYSCHRONIC-SLOWPOKE (DYSC) act antagonistically on synaptic development. Jetlag promotes synaptic growth while DYSC inhibits it. It is also worth notice that JET activity can rescue the arrhythmicity in dysc mutants.

== Evolutionary history ==
Jetlag gene is found in Drosophila (melanogaster). This gene seems to be conserved in a variety of different species, including mouse, rats, zebrafish, chickens, Rhesus monkeys, mosquitos, frogs, dogs, chimpanzees, and humans. Most notably, it is orthologous to FBXL15, which is found in humans. In Drosophila, there are no known paralogs. However, for the human gene FBXL15 (which serves as a JET gene), there are fifteen paralogs.

There are three types of mutations: jet^{c}, jet^{r}, and jet^{set}. Flies that have the jet^{set} mutation have a significantly larger loss of function in terms of degrading TIM in response to short light pulses. Each of the mutations (jet^{c}, jet^{r}, and jet^{set}) are point mutations that create a missense variant. Most of the flies that had jet^{c} and jet^{r} mutations had rhythmic behavior in constant light conditions, which is different from the wild-type flies who mostly had arrhythmicity. In constant darkness, the wild-type flies and the flies with the jet^{c} and jet^{r} mutations had similar behavior. It was concluded that the jet^{c} and jet^{r} mutations reduce light sensitivity and reduce phase shifts relative to wild-type flies in response to brief light pulses. The jet^{r} mutation is conserved in insects and mammals and is less effective at ubiquitination of TIM. Additionally, the jet^{r} mutation is significantly less effective at TIM degradation, which is possibly due to the decreased stability of the JET protein. There was a difference between the jet^{c} mutation and the wild-type in TIM degradation, but this difference was not significantly different. Scientists indicate that this may be due to the comparatively less conserved nature of the mutation as seen through its presence only in insects.

=== Discovery history ===
In 2006, it was discovered that there was a mutant strain in Drosophila (melanogaster) that took longer to re-entrain to a new light-dark cycle, meaning that there was a phase shift. This mutant strain, which was called Jetlag, was identified by Kunghee Koh, Xiangzhong Zheng, and Amita Sehgal from the Department of Neuroscience at the University of Pennsylvania School of Medicine. Through further research, it was concluded that the Jetlag gene plays an important role in resetting the circadian clock by transmitting light signals from the circadian photoreceptor cryptochrome (CRY) to the clock protein TIM.

== Current research ==
Recent research has been done on the reintroduction of entrainment in JET mutants by using other factors. Factors such as visual and olfactory cues have been found to partially restore re-entrainablilty in JET mutants when insects of different genders interact socially. JET's interactions with other chronobiological genes and proteins are also being explored. JET also interacts with other genes and proteins aside from TIM. DYSC and SLO, a circadian locomotor regulator protein and a potassium channel gene respectively, interact antagonistically with JET where the JET mutant was able to rescue both DYSC and SLO mutants. Substrates of JET can be explored to help better understand its mechanisms and explore other interactions it might have. Interactions of JET can also help clarify the mechanism of its mammalian homolog FBXL15 and its effects on the mammalian system and its implications of the human circadian system.

== Mammalian homolog ==
The JET gene has a mammalian homolog counterpart under the F-box protein of the FBXL family named FBXL15 that is conserved in many animals such as chimpanzees, dogs and mice. It forms a ubiquitin ligase complex and affects the ubiquitination and proteasomal degradation of SMURF1, which regulates the BMP pathway.
