= Lethal allele =

Alleles responsible for death of an organism

Lethal alleles also known as lethals, are alleles that cause the death of the organism that carries them. They are usually a result of mutations in genes that are essential for growth or development. Lethal alleles can be recessive, dominant, conditional, perinatal, or postnatal after an extended period of apparently normal development depending on the gene or genes involved.

Lethal alleles may specifically refer to embryonically lethal alleles, in which the fetus will never survive to term. Such alleles are a cause of non-Mendelian patterns of inheritance, such as the observation of traits in a 2:1 ratio.

== History ==
Punnett square for the agouti gene in mice, demonstrating a recessive lethal allele.

Lethal alleles were first discovered by Lucien Cuénot in 1905 while studying the inheritance of coat colour in mice. The agouti gene in mice is largely responsible for determining coat colour. The wild-type allele produces a blend of yellow and black pigmentation in each hair of the mouse. This yellow and black blend may be referred to as 'agouti' in colour. One of the mutant alleles of the agouti gene results in mice with a much lighter, yellowish colour. When these yellow mice were crossed with homozygous wild-type mice, a 1:1 ratio of yellow and dark grey offspring were obtained. This indicated that the yellow mutation is dominant, and all the parental yellow mice were heterozygotes for the mutant allele.

By mating two yellow mice, Cuénot expected to observe a usual 1:2:1 Mendelian ratio of homozygous agouti to heterozygous yellow to homozygous yellow. Instead, he always observed a 1:2 ratio of agouti to yellow mice. He was unable to produce any mice that were homozygous for the yellow agouti allele.

It was not until 1910 that W. E. Castle and C. C. Little confirmed Cuénot's work, further demonstrating that one quarter of the offspring were dying during embryonic development. This was the first documented example of a recessive embryonic lethal allele.

== Types of lethal allele ==
Lethal alleles can also refer to any allele that can result in a terminal condition.

=== Recessive lethals ===
A pair of identical alleles that are both present in an organism that ultimately results in death of that organism are referred to as recessive lethal alleles. Though recessive lethals may code for dominant or recessive traits, they are only fatal in the homozygous condition. Heterozygotes will sometimes display a form of diseased phenotype in addition to an apparently dominant phenotype, as yellow mice are particularly susceptible to diabetes and obesity.

An example of a lethal allele in humans are the BRCA mutations; inheriting one defective BRCA allele results in a greatly increased risk of breast cancer and ovarian cancer, while inheriting both defective alleles is embryonically lethal in almost all cases. For live cases, inheriting both mutations lead to a grave prognosis where survival almost never extends beyond childhood. This is because the BRCA mutations also result in a severe subtype of Fanconi anemia (FA-S for BRCA1, FA-D1 for BRCA2), itself an extremely rare medical condition.

Another example of a recessive lethal allele occurs in the Manx cat. Manx cats possess a heterozygous mutation resulting in a shortened or missing tail. Crosses of two heterozygous Manx cats result in two-thirds of surviving offspring displaying the heterozygous shortened tail phenotype, and one-third of surviving offspring of normal tail length that is homozygous for a normal allele. Homozygous offspring for the mutant allele cannot survive birth and are therefore not seen in these crosses.

A lethal allele may refer to any allele encoding the disease that results in a terminal condition only in the homozygous or biallelic state. The heterozygous and homozygous phenotype is still expressed in most cases if two different disease-causing alleles are present. Achondroplasia is a skeletal system disorder caused by a recessive allele that can still result in a live birth in the homozygous state. One mutant allele for achondroplasia can be tolerated, but having two results in death. In the case of homozygous achondroplasia, death almost invariably occurs before birth or in the perinatal period. Not all heterozygotes for recessive lethal alleles will show a mutant phenotype, as is the case for cystic fibrosis carriers. If two cystic fibrosis carriers have children, they have a 25 percent chance of producing offspring having two copies of the allele, eventually resulting in the death of the child without intensive treatment.

=== Dominant lethals ===
Alleles that need only be present in one copy in an organism to be fatal are referred to as dominant lethal alleles. These alleles are not commonly found in populations because they usually result in the death of an organism before it can transmit its lethal allele on to its offspring. As a result, few dominant embryonically lethal alleles are documented as they would never show up in the population.

An example in humans of a dominant lethal allele is Huntington's disease, a rare neurodegenerative disorder that ultimately results in premature death. However, because of its late-onset (i.e., often after the affected individual reaches reproductive ability), it is able to be maintained in populations. A person exhibits Huntington's disease when they carry a single copy of a repeat-expanded Huntington allele on chromosome 4.

=== Conditional lethals ===
Alleles that will only be fatal in response to some environmental factor are referred to as conditional lethals. One example of a conditional lethal is favism, a sex-linked inherited condition that causes the carrier to develop hemolytic anemia when they eat fava beans.

An infection of an E. coli host cell by a bacteriophage (phage) T4 temperature sensitive (ts) conditionally lethal mutant at a high restrictive temperature leads to lack of viable phage production. However growth of such mutants can still occur at a lower temperature. Such conditionally lethal ts mutants have been used to identify and characterize the function of many of the phage's genes. Thus genes employed in the repair of DNA damages were identified using ts mutants, as well as genes affecting genetic recombination. For example, growing a ts DNA repair mutant at an intermediate temperature will allow some progeny phage to be produced. However, if that ts mutant is irradiated with UV light, its survival will be more strongly reduced compared to the reduction of survival of irradiated wild-type phage T4. In addition, cold sensitive conditional lethal mutants able to grow at high temperatures, but unable to grow at low temperatures, were also isolated in phage T4. These cold sensitive conditional lethal mutants also defined a set of phage genes. Another class of conditional lethal phage T4 mutants, called amber mutants, are able to grow on some strains of E. coli but not on others. These mutants were also used to initially identify and characterize many of the phage T4 genes, including genes whose encoded proteins function in DNA repair, genetic recombination, DNA replication and molecular morphogenesis. In addition, it was found that an amber mutation produces a "nonsense codon" within a gene that causes polypeptide chain termination during translation. This finding provided insight into a significant aspect of the genetic code.

== See also ==
- Terminator gene
- Incompatible with life
