= Suppressor (disambiguation) =

Suppressor may refer to:

- Suppressor (firearms), an American neologism for a silencer
  - Flash suppressor, flash guard, device attached to the muzzle of a rifle
- Suppressor (genetics)
  - Suppressor mutation
- Suppressor (electrical), device designed to react to sudden or momentary overvoltage
