= Genetic screen =

Biological lab technique

A genetic screen or mutagenesis screen is an experimental technique used to identify and select individuals who possess a phenotype of interest in a mutagenized population. Hence a genetic screen is a type of phenotypic screen. Genetic screens can provide important information on gene function as well as the molecular events that underlie a biological process or pathway. While genome projects have identified an extensive inventory of genes in many different organisms, genetic screens can provide valuable insight as to how those genes function.

== Basic screening ==
Forward genetics (or a forward genetic screen) starts with a phenotype and then attempts to identify the causative mutation and thus gene(s) responsible for the phenotype. For instance, the famous screen by Christiane Nüsslein-Volhard and Eric Wieschaus mutagenized fruit flies and then set out to find the genes causing the observed mutant phenotypes.

Successful forward genetic screens often require a defined genetic background and a simple experimental procedure. That is, when multiple individuals are mutagenized they should be genetically identical so that their wild-type phenotype is identical too and mutant phenotypes are easier to identify. A simple screening method allows for a larger number of individuals to be screened, thereby increasing the probability of generating and identifying mutants of interest.

Since natural allelic mutations are rare prior to screening geneticists often mutagenize a population of individuals by exposing them to a known mutagen, such as a chemical or radiation, thereby generating a much higher frequency of chromosomal mutations. In some organisms mutagens are used to perform saturation screens, that is, a screen used to uncover all genes involved in a particular phenotype. Christiane Nüsslein-Volhard and Eric Wieschaus were the first individuals to perform this type of screening procedure in animals.

Reverse genetics (or a reverse genetic screen), starts with a known gene and assays the effect of its disruption by analyzing the resultant phenotypes. For example, in a knock-out screen, one or more genes are completely deleted and the deletion mutants are tested for phenotypes. Such screens have been done for all genes in many bacteria and even complex organisms, such as C. elegans. A reverse genetic screen typically begins with a gene sequence followed by targeted inactivation. Moreover, it induces mutations in model organisms to learn their role in disease. Reverse genetics is also used to provide extremely accurate statistics on mutations that occur in specific genes. From these screens you are able to determine how fortuitous the mutations are, and how often the mutations occur.

== Screening variations ==
Many screening variations have been devised to elucidate a gene that leads to a mutant phenotype of interest. Another important variant is the synthetic-lethal screen, which looks for mutation pairs that are viable individually but lethal in combination and can reveal genes acting in redundant or parallel pathways.

=== Enhancer ===
An enhancer screen begins with a mutant individual that has an affected process of interest with a known gene mutation. The screen can then be used to identify additional genes or gene mutations that play a role in that biological or physiological process. A genetic enhancer screen identifies mutations that enhance a phenotype of interest in an already mutant individual. The phenotype of the double mutant (individual with both the enhancer and original background mutation) is more prominent than either of the single mutant phenotypes. The enhancement must surpass the expected phenotypes of the two mutations on their own, and therefore each mutation may be considered an enhancer of the other. Isolating enhancer mutants can lead to the identification of interacting genes or genes which act redundantly with respect to one another.

=== Suppressor ===
A suppressor screen is used to identify suppressor mutations that alleviate or revert the phenotype of the original mutation, in a process defined as synthetic viability. Suppressor mutations can be described as second mutations at a site on the chromosome distinct from the mutation under study, which suppress the phenotype of the original mutation. If the mutation is in the same gene as the original mutation it is known as intragenic suppression, whereas a mutation located in a different gene is known as extragenic suppression or intergenic suppression. Suppressor mutations are extremely useful to define the functions of biochemical pathways within a cell and the relationships between different biochemical pathways.

=== Temperature sensitive ===
A temperature-sensitive screen involves performing temperature shifts to enhance a mutant phenotype. A population grown at low temperatures would have a normal phenotype; however, the mutation in the particular gene would make it unstable at a higher temperature. A screen for temperature sensitivity in fruit flies, for example, might involve raising the temperature in the cage until some flies faint, then opening a portal to let the others escape. Individuals selected in a screen are liable to carry an unusual version of a gene involved in the phenotype of interest. An advantage of alleles found in this type of screen is that the mutant phenotype is conditional and can be activated by simply raising the temperature. A null mutation in such a gene may be lethal to the embryo and such mutants would be missed in a basic screen. A famous temperature-sensitive screen was carried out independently by Lee Hartwell and Paul Nurse to identify mutants defective in the cell cycle in S. cerevisiae and S. pombe, respectively.

=== RNAi ===
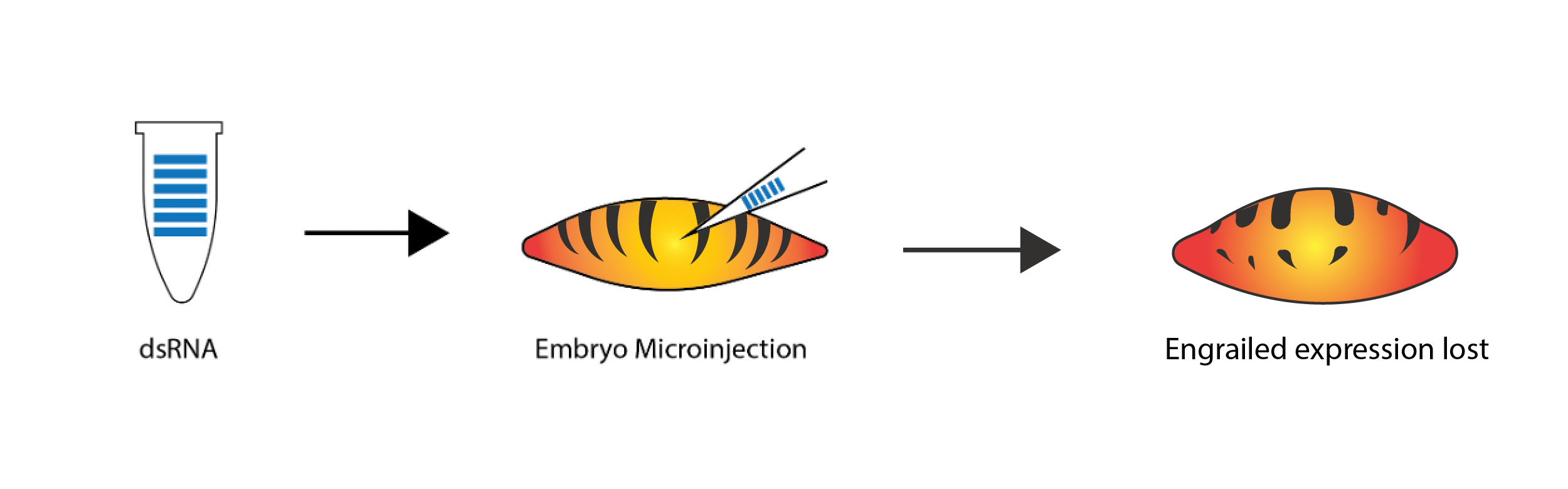
An overview of RNA interference (RNAi) embryonic injection method

RNA interference (RNAi) screen is essentially a forward genetics screen using a reverse genetics technique. Similar to classical genetic screens in the past, large-scale RNAi surveys success depends on a careful development of phenotypic assays and their interpretation. In Drosophila, RNAi has been applied in cultured cells or in vivo to investigate gene functions and to effect the function of single genes on a genome-wide scale. RNAi is used to silence gene expression in Drosophila by injecting dsRNA into early embryos, and interfering with Frizzled and Frizzled2 genes creating defects in embryonic patterning that mimic loss of wingless function.

=== CRISPR ===
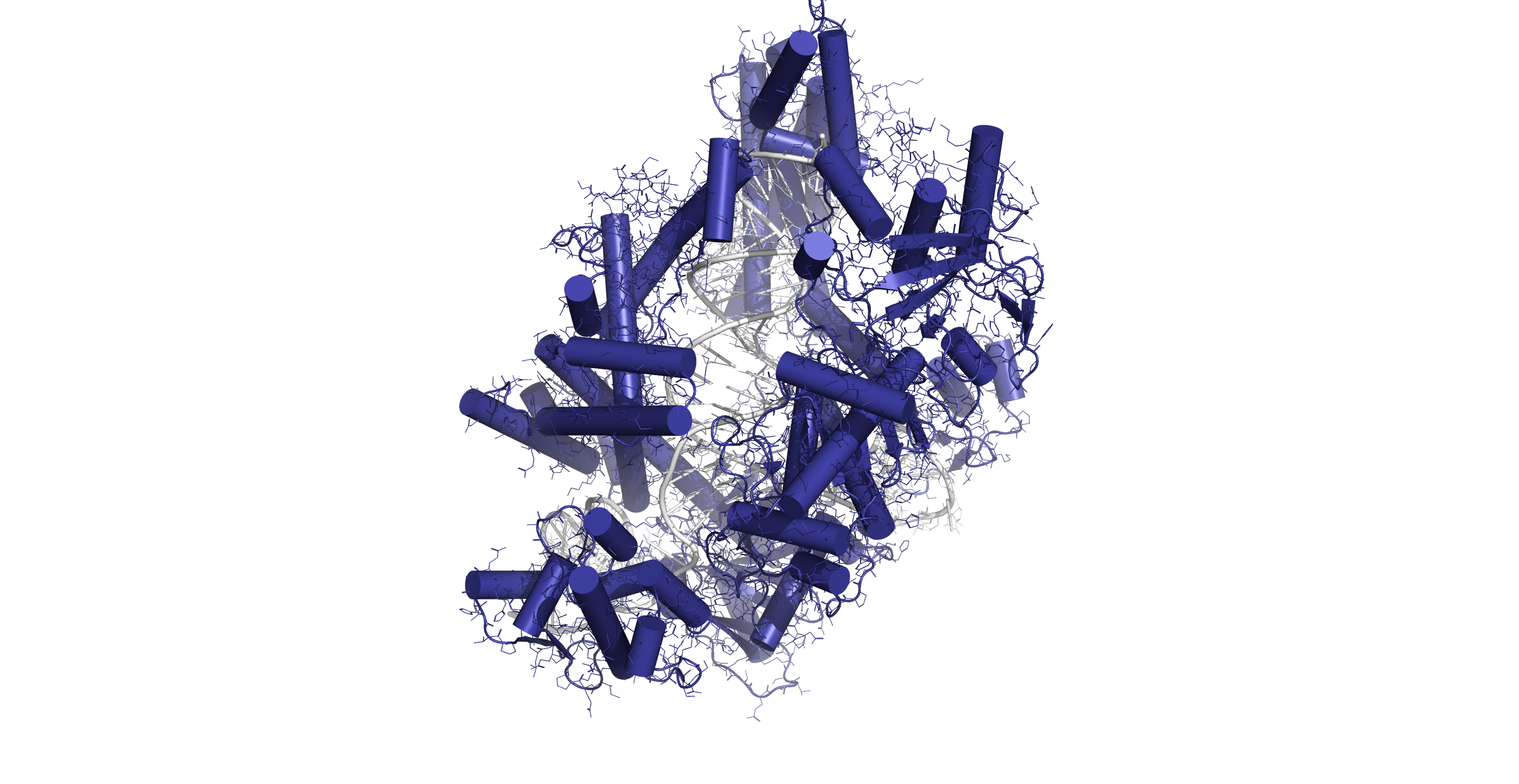
Cas12a in complex with crRNA and target DNA – the key tool for CRISPR screens

CRISPR/Cas is primarily used for reverse genetic screens. CRISPR has the ability to create libraries of thousands of precise genetic mutations and can identify new tumors as well as validate older tumors in cancer research. Genome-scale CRISPR-Cas9 knockout (GeCKO) library targeting 18,080 genes with 64,751 unique guide sequences identify genes essential for cell viability in cancer. Bacterial CRISPR–Cas9 system for engineering both loss of function (LOF) and gain of function (GOF) mutations in untransformed human intestinal organoids in order to demonstrate a model of Colorectal cancer (CRC). It can also be used to study functional consequences of mutations in vivo by enabling direct genome editing in somatic cells.

== Mapping mutants ==
By the classical genetics approach, a researcher would then locate (map) the gene on its chromosome by crossbreeding with individuals that carry other unusual traits and collecting statistics on how frequently the two traits are inherited together. Classical geneticists would have used phenotypic traits to map the new mutant alleles. With the advent of genomic sequences for model systems such as Drosophila melanogaster, Arabidopsis thaliana and C. elegans many single nucleotide polymorphisms (SNPs) have now been identified that can be used as traits for mapping. In fact, the Heidelberg screen, allowing mass testing of mutants and developed in 1980 by Nüsslein-Volhard and Wieschaus, cleared the way for future scientists in this field. SNPs are the preferred traits for mapping since they are very frequent, on the order of one difference per 1000 base pairs, between different varieties of organism. Mutagens such as random DNA insertions by transformation or active transposons can also be used to generate new mutants. These techniques have the advantage of tagging the new alleles with a known molecular (DNA) marker that can facilitate the rapid identification of the gene.

== Positional cloning ==
Positional cloning is a method of gene identification in which a gene for a specific phenotype is identified only by its approximate chromosomal location (but not the function); this is known as the candidate region. Initially, the candidate region can be defined using techniques such as linkage analysis, and positional cloning is then used to narrow the candidate region until the gene and its mutations are found. Positional cloning typically involves the isolation of partially overlapping DNA segments from genomic libraries to progress along the chromosome toward a specific gene. During the course of positional cloning, one needs to determine whether the DNA segment currently under consideration is part of the gene.

Tests used for this purpose include cross-species hybridization, identification of unmethylated CpG islands, exon trapping, direct cDNA selection, computer analysis of DNA sequence, mutation screening in affected individuals, and tests of gene expression. For genomes in which the regions of genetic polymorphisms are known, positional cloning involves identifying polymorphisms that flank the mutation. This process requires that DNA fragments from the closest known genetic marker are progressively cloned and sequenced, getting closer to the mutant allele with each new clone. This process produces a contig map of the locus and is known as chromosome walking. With the completion of genome sequencing projects such as the Human Genome Project, modern positional cloning can use ready-made contigs from the genome sequence databases directly.

For each new DNA clone a polymorphism is identified and tested in the mapping population for its recombination frequency compared to the mutant phenotype. When the DNA clone is at or close to the mutant allele, the recombination frequency should be close to zero. If the chromosome walk proceeds through the mutant allele, the new polymorphisms will start to show increase in recombination frequency compared to the mutant phenotype. Depending on the size of the mapping population, the mutant allele can be narrowed down to a small region (<30 Kb). Sequence comparison between wild type and mutant DNA in that region is then required to locate the DNA mutation that causes the phenotypic difference.

Modern positional cloning can more directly extract information from genomic sequencing projects and existing data by analyzing the genes in the candidate region. Potential disease genes from the candidate region can then be prioritized, potentially reducing the amount of work involved. Genes with expression patterns consistent with the disease phenotype, showing a (putative) function related to the phenotype, or homologous to another gene linked to the phenotype are all priority candidates. Generalization of positional cloning techniques in this manner is also known as positional gene discovery.

Positional cloning is an effective method to isolate disease genes in an unbiased manner and has been used to identify disease genes for Duchenne muscular dystrophy, Huntington's disease, and cystic fibrosis. However, complications in the analysis arise if the disease exhibits locus heterogeneity.
