= Epistasis =

Dependence of a gene mutation's phenotype on mutations in other genes

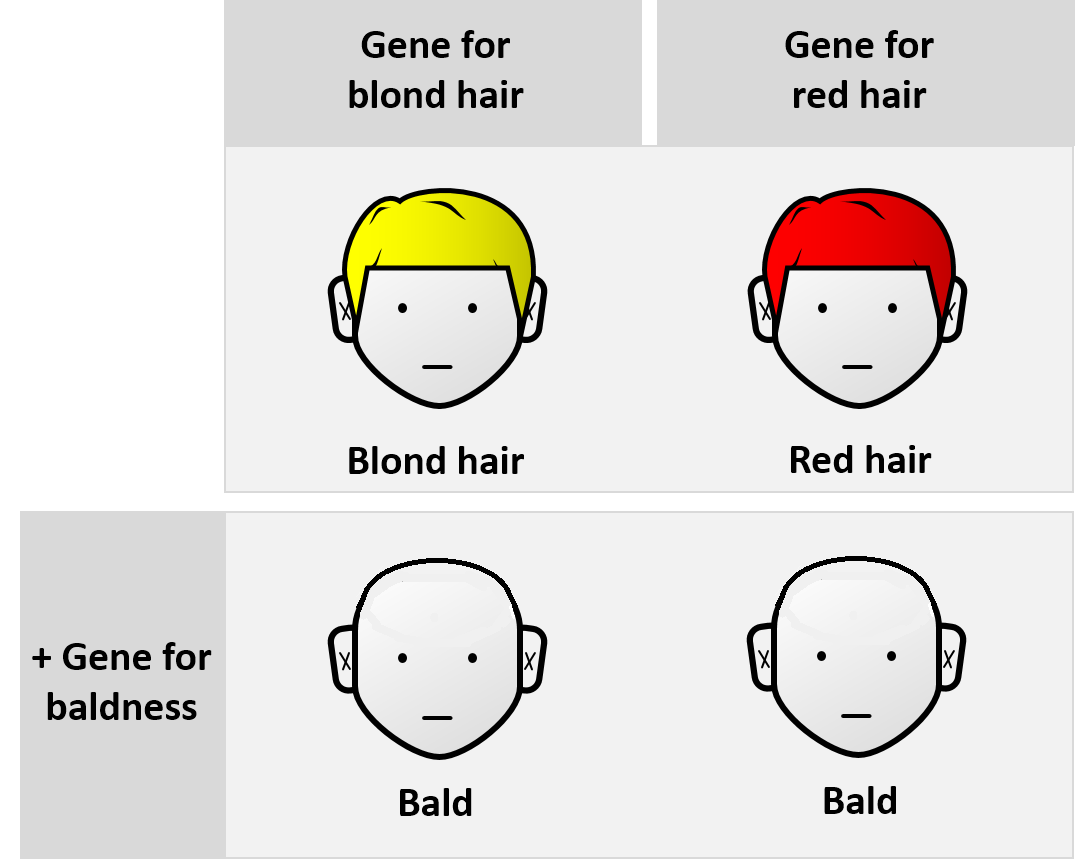
An example of epistasis is the interaction between hair colour and baldness. A gene for total baldness would be epistatic to one for blond hair or red hair. The hair-colour genes are hypostatic to the baldness gene. The baldness phenotype supersedes genes for hair colour, and so the effects are non-additive.

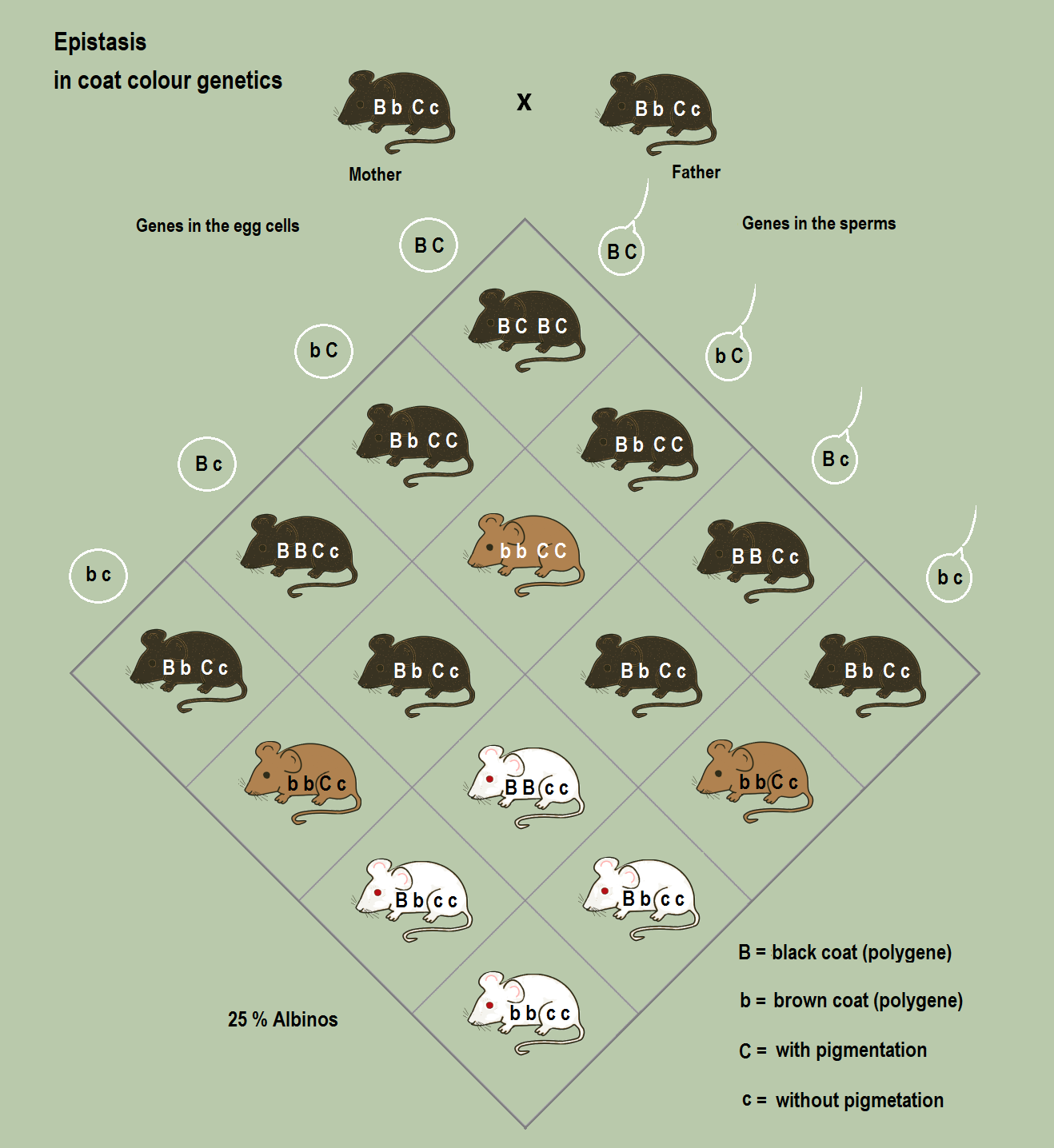
Example of epistasis in coat colour genetics: If no pigments can be produced the other coat colour genes have no effect on the phenotype, no matter if they are dominant or if the individual is homozygous. Here the genotype "c c" for no pigmentation is epistatic over the other genes.

Epistasis is a phenomenon in genetics in which the effect of a mutation on a trait is dependent on the presence or absence of mutations at different loci (locations on the genome), that may be on the same gene (intragenic) or on different genes, called modifier genes. In evolutionary genetics, epistasis occurs when the combined effect of two mutations is different from what you would expect by simply adding their individual effects together. This definition can be expanded to more than two loci to study higher-order epistasis, which plays an important role in shaping evolutionary trajectories.

The term epistasis was introduced in 1907 to describe the discrepancy between the prediction of segregation ratios based on the action of individual genes and the actual outcome of a dihybrid cross, and is now widely used in biochemistry, computational biology and evolutionary biology. While the nuanced meaning of the term now differs between researchers studying genetics at a functional, compositional, or at a statistical level, it still describes gene interactions at various levels.

== History ==
Understanding of epistasis has changed considerably through the history of genetics and so too has the use of the term. The term was first used in 1907 by William Bateson and his collaborators Florence Durham and Muriel Wheldale Onslow. In early models of natural selection devised in the early 20th century, each gene was considered to make its own characteristic contribution to fitness, against an average background of other genes. Some introductory courses still teach population genetics this way. Because of the way that the science of population genetics was developed, evolutionary geneticists have tended to think of epistasis as the exception. However, in general, the expression of any one allele depends in a complicated way on many other alleles.

In classical genetics, if genes A and B are mutated, and each mutation by itself produces a unique phenotype but the two mutations together show the same phenotype as the gene A mutation, then gene A is epistatic and gene B is hypostatic. For example, the gene for total baldness is epistatic to the gene for brown hair, because the baldness phenotype masks the expression of the hair color gene. As the study of genetics developed, and with the advent of molecular biology, the focus shifted from simple (and complete) masking effects to the complex, quantitative interactions between genes. Consequently, the definition of epistasis has expanded to describe any non-additive interaction between two or more mutations.

The effects of genes are now commonly quantifiable by assaying the magnitude of a phenotype (e.g. height, pigmentation or growth rate) or by biochemically assaying protein activity (e.g. binding or catalysis). Increasingly sophisticated computational and evolutionary biology models aim to describe the effects of epistasis on a genome-wide scale and the consequences of this for evolution. Since identification of epistatic pairs is challenging both computationally and statistically, many studies have tried to prioritize epistatic pairs. In recent years, however, high throughput experiments and computational assays have allowed researchers to also study higher-order epistasis (where more than two mutations at different loci interact).

== Classification ==
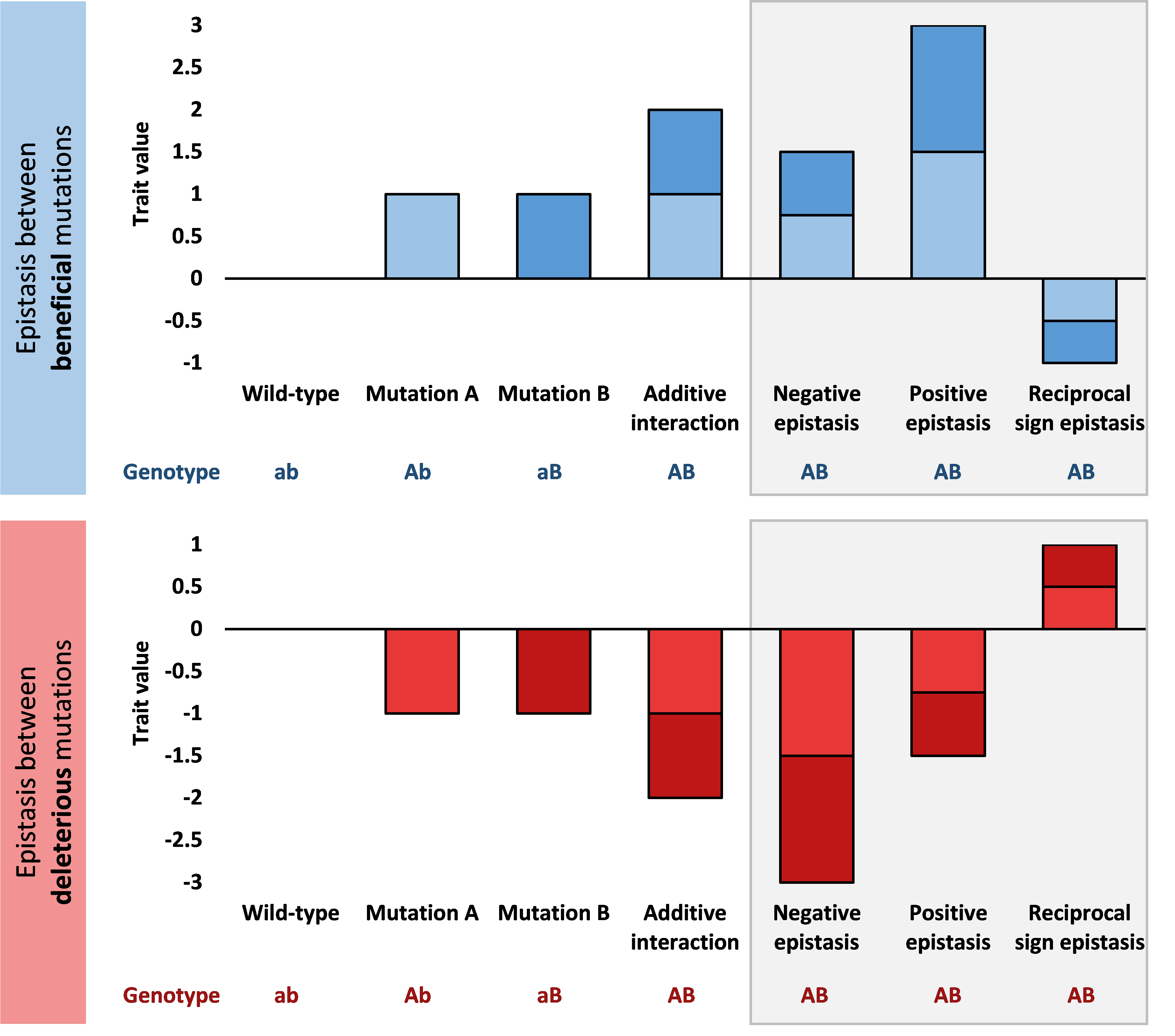
Quantitative trait values after two mutations either alone (Ab and aB) or in combination (AB). Bars contained in the grey box indicate the combined trait value under different circumstances of epistasis. Upper panel indicates epistasis between beneficial mutations (blue). Lower panel indicates epistasis between deleterious mutations (red).

Since, on average, mutations are deleterious, random mutations to an organism cause a decline in fitness. If all mutations are additive, fitness will fall proportionally to mutation number (black line). When deleterious mutations display negative (synergistic) epistasis, they are more deleterious in combination than individually and so fitness falls with the number of mutations at an increasing rate (upper, red line). When mutations display positive (antagonistic) epistasis, effects of mutations are less severe in combination than individually and so fitness falls at a decreasing rate (lower, blue line).

Terminology about epistasis can vary between scientific fields. Additionally, there are differences when looking at epistasis within a single gene and epistasis within a haploid or diploid genome. In general, epistasis is used to denote the departure from 'independence' of the effects of different genetic loci. Confusion often arises due to the varied interpretation of 'independence' among different branches of biology. The classifications below attempt to cover the various terms and how they relate to one another.

=== Additivity ===
Two mutations are considered to be purely additive if the effect of the double mutation is the "sum of the effects" of the single mutations. This occurs when genes do not interact with each other, for example by acting through different metabolic pathways. Simply, additive traits were studied early on in the history of genetics, however they are relatively rare, with most genes exhibiting at least some level of epistatic interaction.

Note that "sum of effects" is a subjective term that depends on weather the mutation on the trait being studied behaves additively or multiplicatively. The same mutation can behave either ways if the definition of the trait being studied changes. For example, while both Malthusian and Wrightian selection coefficients quantify the fitness effect of a mutation, mutations that are multiplicative in Wrightian fitness behave additively in Malthusian fitness (since Malthusian fitness is the logarithm of Wrightian fitness).

=== Magnitude epistasis ===
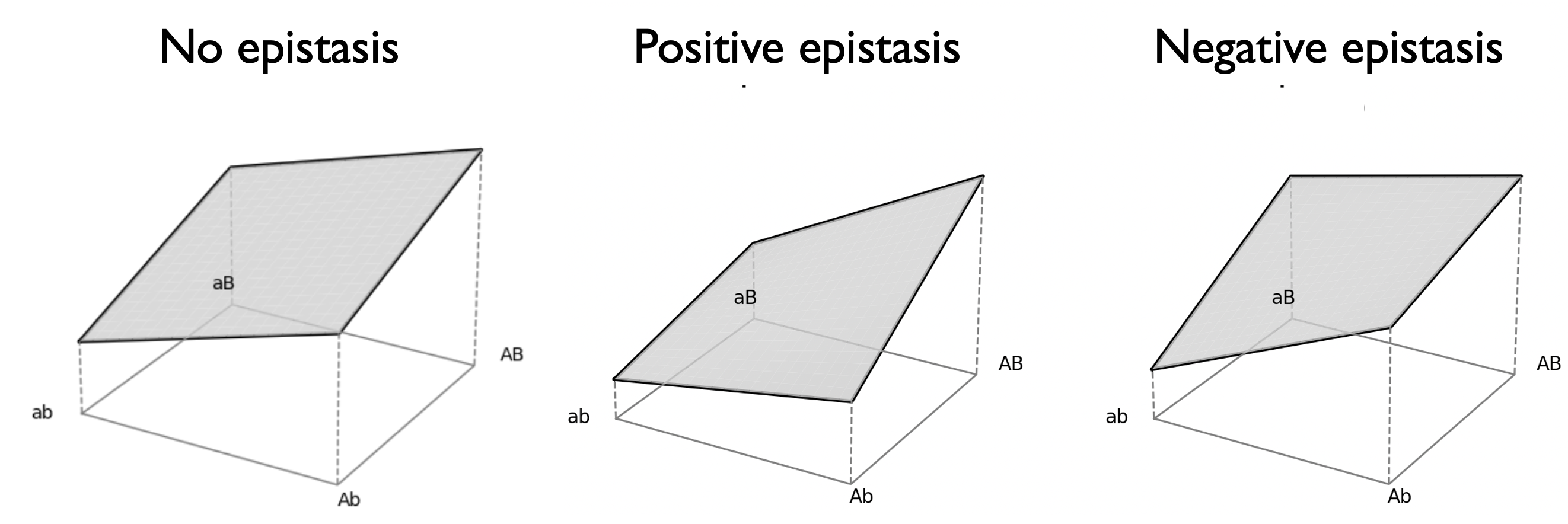
The figure shows three illustrations of epistasis on a fitness landscape of a haploid genome. The horizontal axes represent different loci on the genome, with different points on each axis representing possible alleles on that loci. The vertical axis represents the fitness (phenotype) of the genotype in a given environment. In the leftmost case, the fitness effect of any mutation (example a → A) is the same, regardless of the allele present on other loci. This serves as a null expectation for no epistasis. In the middle figure, the double mutant has higher than the null expectation (after the mutation b → B, the fitness effect of a → A is higher, and vice versa), signifying positive epistasis. Similarly, the rightmost figure signifies negative epistasis since the double mutant has a lower fitness than the null expectation.

When the double mutation has a fitter phenotype than expected from the effects of the two single mutations, it is referred to as positive epistasis. Positive epistasis between beneficial mutations generates greater improvements in function than expected. Positive epistasis between deleterious mutations protects against the negative effects to cause a less severe fitness drop.

Conversely, when two mutations together lead to a less fit phenotype than expected from their effects when alone, it is called negative epistasis. Negative epistasis between beneficial mutations causes smaller than expected fitness improvements, whereas negative epistasis between deleterious mutations causes greater-than-additive fitness drops.

Independently, when the effect on fitness of two mutations is more radical than expected from their effects when alone, it is referred to as synergistic epistasis. The opposite situation, when the fitness difference of the double mutant from the wild type is smaller than expected from the effects of the two single mutations, it is called antagonistic epistasis. Therefore, for deleterious mutations, negative epistasis is also synergistic, while positive epistasis is antagonistic; conversely, for advantageous mutations, positive epistasis is synergistic, while negative epistasis is antagonistic.

The term genetic enhancement is sometimes used when a double (deleterious) mutant has a more severe phenotype than the additive effects of the single mutants. Strong positive epistasis is sometimes referred to by creationists as irreducible complexity (although most examples are misidentified).

=== Sign epistasis ===
Sign epistasis occurs when mutations have the opposite effect when in the presence of other mutations. For example, a large and complex brain is a waste of energy without a range of sense organs, but sense organs are made more useful by a large and complex brain that can better process the information. The absence of sign epistasis causes a fitness landscape to be smooth (also called a Mt Fuji landscape), since every single mutation step towards the optimum genotype would be monotonically adaptive.

At its most extreme, reciprocal sign epistasis occurs when two deleterious genes are beneficial when together. For example, producing a toxin alone can kill a bacterium, and producing a toxin exporter alone can waste energy, but producing both can improve fitness by killing competing organisms. If a fitness landscape has sign epistasis but no reciprocal sign epistasis then it is called semismooth. Reciprocal sign epistasis is a necessary condition for ruggedness (multiple peaks) in a fitness landscape.

Reciprocal sign epistasis can also lead to an extreme form of genetic suppression whereby two individually deleterious mutations are beneficial when present together. A clear example of genetic suppression was the demonstration that in the assembly of bacteriophage T4 two deleterious mutations, each causing a deficiency in the level of a different morphogenetic protein, could interact positively. If a mutation causes a reduction in a particular structural component, this can bring about an imbalance in morphogenesis and loss of viable virus progeny, but production of viable progeny can be restored by a second (suppressor) mutation in another morphogenetic component that restores the balance of protein components.

The term genetic suppression can also apply to sign epistasis where the double mutant has a phenotype intermediate between those of the single mutants, in which case the more severe single mutant phenotype is suppressed by the other mutation or genetic condition. For example, in a diploid organism, a hypomorphic (or partial loss-of-function) mutant phenotype can be suppressed by knocking out one copy of a gene that acts oppositely in the same pathway. In this case, the second gene is described as a "dominant suppressor" of the hypomorphic mutant; "dominant" because the effect is seen when one wild-type copy of the suppressor gene is present (i.e., even in a heterozygote). For most genes, the phenotype of the heterozygous suppressor mutation by itself would be wild type (because most genes are not haplo-insufficient), so that the double mutant (suppressed) phenotype is intermediate between those of the single mutants.

In non reciprocal sign epistasis, fitness of the mutant lies in the middle of that of the extreme effects seen in reciprocal sign epistasis.

When two mutations are viable alone but lethal in combination, it is called Synthetic lethality or unlinked non-complementation.

=== Haploid organisms ===
In a haploid organism with genotypes (at two loci) ab, Ab, aB or AB, we can think of different forms of epistasis as affecting the magnitude of a phenotype upon mutation individually (Ab and aB) or in combination (AB).

Interaction type	ab	Ab	aB	AB
No epistasis (additive)	0	1	1	2	AB = Ab + aB + ab
Positive (synergistic) epistasis	0	1	1	3	AB > Ab + aB + ab
Negative (antagonistic) epistasis	0	1	1	1	AB < Ab + aB + ab
Sign epistasis	0	1	-1	2	AB has opposite sign to Ab or aB
Reciprocal sign epistasis	0	-1	-1	2	AB has opposite sign to Ab and aB

=== Diploid organisms ===
Epistasis in diploid organisms is further complicated by the presence of two copies of each gene. Epistasis can occur between loci, but additionally, interactions can occur between the two copies of each locus in heterozygotes. For a two locus, two allele system, there are eight independent types of gene interaction.

Additive A locus				Additive B locus				Dominance A locus				Dominance B locus
	aa	aA	AA		aa	aA	AA		aa	aA	AA		aa	aA	AA
bb	1	0	–1	bb	1	1	1	bb	–1	1	–1	bb	–1	–1	–1
bB	1	0	–1	bB	0	0	0	bB	–1	1	–1	bB	1	1	1
BB	1	0	–1	BB	–1	–1	–1	BB	–1	1	–1	BB	–1	–1	–1
Additive by Additive Epistasis				Additive by Dominance Epistasis				Dominance by Additive Epistasis				Dominance by Dominance Epistasis
	aa	aA	AA		aa	aA	AA		aa	aA	AA		aa	aA	AA
bb	1	0	–1	bb	1	0	–1	bb	1	–1	1	bb	–1	1	–1
bB	0	0	0	bB	–1	0	1	bB	0	0	0	bB	1	–1	1
BB	–1	0	1	BB	1	0	–1	BB	–1	1	–1	BB	–1	1	–1

== Genetic and molecular causes ==
=== Additivity ===
This can be the case when multiple genes act in parallel to achieve the same effect. For example, when an organism is in need of phosphorus, multiple enzymes that break down different phosphorylated components from the environment may act additively to increase the amount of phosphorus available to the organism. However, there inevitably comes a point where phosphorus is no longer the limiting factor for growth and reproduction and so further improvements in phosphorus metabolism have smaller or no effect (negative epistasis). Some sets of mutations within genes have also been specifically found to be additive. It is now considered that strict additivity is the exception, rather than the rule, since most genes interact with hundreds or thousands of other genes.

=== Epistasis between genes ===
Epistasis within the genomes of organisms occurs due to interactions between the genes within the genome. This interaction may be direct if the genes encode proteins that, for example, are separate components of a multi-component protein (such as the ribosome), inhibit each other's activity, or if the protein encoded by one gene modifies the other (such as by phosphorylation). Alternatively the interaction may be indirect, where the genes encode components of a metabolic pathway or network, developmental pathway, signalling pathway or transcription factor network. For example, the gene encoding the enzyme that synthesizes penicillin is of no use to a fungus without the enzymes that synthesize the necessary precursors in the metabolic pathway.

=== Epistasis within genes ===
Just as mutations in two separate genes can be non-additive if those genes interact, mutations in two codons within a gene can be non-additive. In genetics this is sometimes called intragenic suppression when one deleterious mutation can be compensated for by a second mutation within that gene. Analysis of bacteriophage T4 mutants that were altered in the rIIB cistron (gene) revealed that certain pairwise combinations of mutations could mutually suppress each other; that is the double mutants had a more nearly wild-type phenotype than either mutant alone. The linear map order of the mutants was established using genetic recombination data. From these sources of information, the triplet nature of the genetic code was logically deduced for the first time in 1961, and other key features of the code were also inferred.

Also intragenic suppression can occur when the amino acids within a protein interact. Due to the complexity of protein folding and activity, additive mutations are rare.

Proteins are held in their tertiary structure by a distributed, internal network of cooperative interactions (hydrophobic, polar and covalent). Epistatic interactions occur whenever one mutation alters the local environment of another residue (either by directly contacting it, or by inducing changes in the protein structure). For example, in a disulphide bridge, a single cysteine has no effect on protein stability until a second is present at the correct location at which point the two cysteines form a chemical bond which enhances the stability of the protein. This would be observed as positive epistasis where the double-cysteine variant had a much higher stability than either of the single-cysteine variants. Conversely, when deleterious mutations are introduced, proteins often exhibit mutational robustness whereby as stabilising interactions are destroyed the protein still functions until it reaches some stability threshold at which point further destabilising mutations have large, detrimental effects as the protein can no longer fold. This leads to negative epistasis whereby mutations that have little effect alone have a large, deleterious effect together.

In enzymes, the protein structure orients a few, key amino acids into precise geometries to form an active site to perform chemistry. Since these active site networks frequently require the cooperation of multiple components, mutating any one of these components massively compromises activity, and so mutating a second component has a relatively minor effect on the already inactivated enzyme. For example, removing any member of the catalytic triad of many enzymes will reduce activity to levels low enough that the organism is no longer viable.

==== Heterozygotic epistasis ====
Diploid organisms contain two copies of each gene. If these are different (heterozygous / heteroallelic), the two different copies of the allele may interact with each other to cause epistasis. This is sometimes called allelic complementation, or interallelic complementation. It may be caused by several mechanisms, for example transvection, where an enhancer from one allele acts in trans to activate transcription from the promoter of the second allele. Alternately, trans-splicing of two non-functional RNA molecules may produce a single, functional RNA.

Similarly, at the protein level, proteins that function as dimers may form a heterodimer composed of one protein from each alternate gene and may display different properties to the homodimer of one or both variants. Two bacteriophage T4 mutants defective at different locations in the same gene can undergo allelic complementation during a mixed infection. That is, each mutant alone upon infection cannot produce viable progeny, but upon mixed infection with two complementing mutants, viable phage are formed. Intragenic complementation was demonstrated for several genes that encode structural proteins of the bacteriophage indicating that such proteins function as dimers or even higher order multimers.

== Evolutionary consequences ==
=== Fitness landscapes and evolvability ===
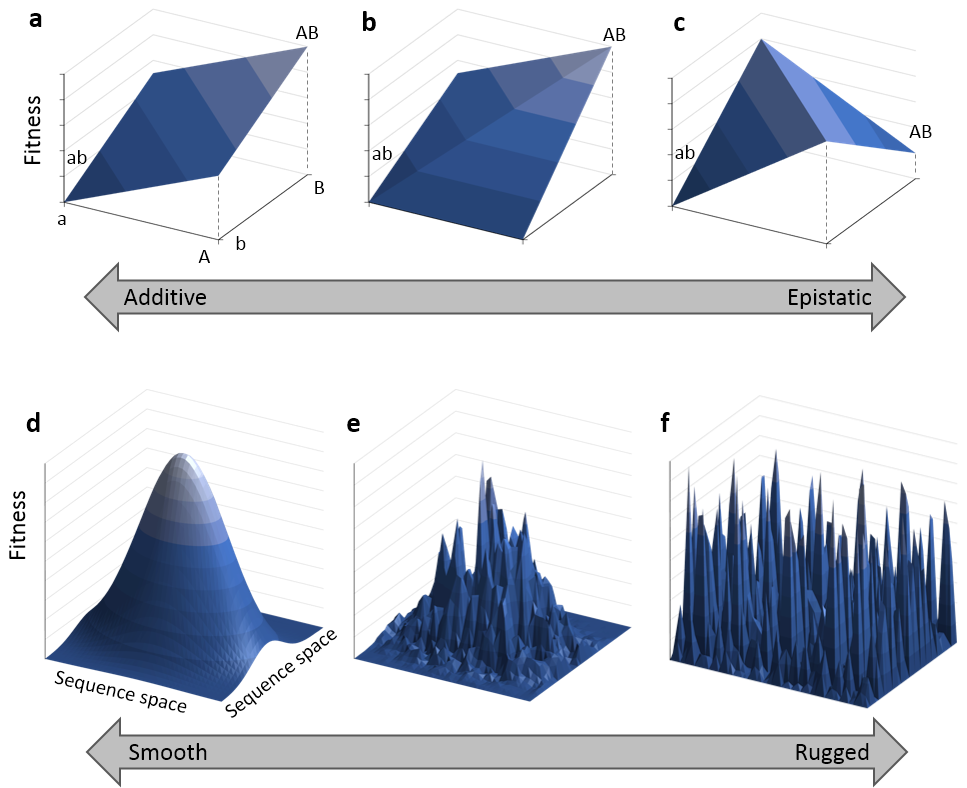
The top row indicates interactions between two genes that show either (a) additive effects, (b) positive epistasis or (c) reciprocal sign epistasis. Below are fitness landscapes which display greater and greater levels of global epistasis between large numbers of genes. Purely additive interactions lead to a single smooth peak (d); as increasing numbers of genes exhibit epistasis, the landscape becomes more rugged (e), and when all genes interact epistatically the landscape becomes so rugged that mutations have seemingly random effects (f).

In evolutionary genetics, the sign of epistasis is usually more significant than the magnitude of epistasis. This is because magnitude epistasis (positive and negative) simply affects how beneficial mutations are together, however sign epistasis affects whether mutation combinations are beneficial or deleterious.

A fitness landscape is a representation of the fitness where all genotypes are arranged in 2D space and the fitness of each genotype is represented by height on a surface. It is frequently used as a visual metaphor for understanding evolution as the process of moving uphill from one genotype to the next, nearby, fitter genotype.

If all mutations are additive, they can be acquired in any order and still give a continuous uphill trajectory. The landscape is perfectly smooth, with only one peak (global maximum) and all sequences can evolve uphill to it by the accumulation of beneficial mutations in any order. Conversely, if mutations interact with one another by epistasis, the fitness landscape becomes rugged as the effect of a mutation depends on the genetic background of other mutations. At its most extreme, interactions are so complex that the fitness is 'uncorrelated' with gene sequence and the topology of the landscape is random. This is referred to as a rugged fitness landscape and has profound implications for the evolutionary optimisation of organisms. If mutations are deleterious in one combination but beneficial in another, the fittest genotypes can only be accessed by accumulating mutations in one specific order. This makes it more likely that organisms will get stuck at local maxima in the fitness landscape having acquired mutations in the 'wrong' order. For example, a variant of TEM1 β-lactamase with 5 mutations is able to cleave cefotaxime (a third generation antibiotic). However, of the 120 possible pathways to this 5-mutant variant, only 7% are accessible to evolution as the remainder passed through fitness valleys where the combination of mutations reduces activity. In contrast, changes in environment (and therefore the shape of the fitness landscape) have been shown to provide escape from local maxima. In this example, selection in changing antibiotic environments resulted in a "gateway mutation" which epistatically interacted in a positive manner with other mutations along an evolutionary pathway, effectively crossing a fitness valley. This gateway mutation alleviated the negative epistatic interactions of other individually beneficial mutations, allowing them to better function in concert. Complex environments or selections may therefore bypass local maxima found in models assuming simple positive selection.

High epistasis is usually considered a constraining factor on evolution, and improvements in a highly epistatic trait are considered to have lower evolvability. This is because, in any given genetic background, very few mutations will be beneficial, even though many mutations may need to occur to eventually improve the trait. The lack of a smooth landscape makes it harder for evolution to access fitness peaks. In highly rugged landscapes, fitness valleys block access to some genes, and even if ridges exist that allow access, these may be rare or prohibitively long. Moreover, adaptation can move proteins into more precarious or rugged regions of the fitness landscape. These shifting "fitness territories" may act to decelerate evolution and could represent tradeoffs for adaptive traits.

The frustration of adaptive evolution by rugged fitness landscapes was recognized as a potential force for the evolution of evolvability. Michael Conrad in 1972 was the first to propose a mechanism for the evolution of evolvability by noting that a mutation which smoothed the fitness landscape at other loci could facilitate the production of advantageous mutations and hitchhike along with them. Rupert Riedl in 1975 proposed that new genes which produced the same phenotypic effects with a single mutation as other loci with reciprocal sign epistasis would be a new means to attain a phenotype otherwise too unlikely to occur by mutation.

Rugged, epistatic fitness landscapes also affect the trajectories of evolution. When a mutation has a large number of epistatic effects, each accumulated mutation drastically changes the set of available beneficial mutations. Therefore, the evolutionary trajectory followed depends highly on which early mutations were accepted. Thus, repeats of evolution from the same starting point tend to diverge to different local maxima rather than converge on a single global maximum as they would in a smooth, additive landscape.

=== Evolution of sex ===
Negative epistasis and sex are thought to be intimately correlated. Experimentally, this idea has been tested in using digital simulations of asexual and sexual populations. Over time, sexual populations move towards more negative epistasis, or the lowering of fitness by two interacting alleles. It is thought that negative epistasis allows individuals carrying the interacting deleterious mutations to be removed from the populations efficiently. This removes those alleles from the population, resulting in an overall more fit population. This hypothesis was proposed by Alexey Kondrashov, and is sometimes known as the deleterious mutation hypothesis and has also been tested using artificial gene networks.

However, the evidence for this hypothesis has not always been straightforward and the model proposed by Kondrashov has been criticized for assuming mutation parameters far from real world observations. In addition, in those tests which used artificial gene networks, negative epistasis is only found in more densely connected networks, whereas empirical evidence indicates that natural gene networks are sparsely connected, and theory shows that selection for robustness will favor more sparsely connected and minimally complex networks.

== Methods and model systems ==
=== Regression analysis ===
Quantitative genetics focuses on genetic variance due to genetic interactions. Any two locus interactions at a particular gene frequency can be decomposed into eight independent genetic effects using a weighted regression. In this regression, the observed two locus genetic effects are treated as dependent variables and the "pure" genetic effects are used as the independent variables. Because the regression is weighted, the partitioning among the variance components will change as a function of gene frequency. By analogy it is possible to expand this system to three or more loci, or to cytonuclear interactions

=== Double mutant cycles ===
When assaying epistasis within a gene, site-directed mutagenesis can be used to generate the different genes, and their protein products can be assayed (e.g. for stability or catalytic activity). This is sometimes called a double mutant cycle and involves producing and assaying the wild type protein, the two single mutants and the double mutant. Epistasis is measured as the difference between the effects of the mutations together versus the sum of their individual effects. This can be expressed as a free energy of interaction. The same methodology can be used to investigate the interactions between larger sets of mutations but all combinations have to be produced and assayed. For example, there are 120 different combinations of 5 mutations, some or all of which may show epistasis...

=== Computational prediction ===
Numerous computational methods have been developed for the detection and characterization of epistasis. Many of these rely on machine learning to detect non-additive effects that might be missed by statistical approaches such as linear regression. For example, multifactor dimensionality reduction (MDR) was designed specifically for nonparametric and model-free detection of combinations of genetic variants that are predictive of a phenotype such as disease status in human populations. Several of these approaches have been broadly reviewed in the literature. Even more recently, methods that utilize insights from theoretical computer science (the Hadamard transform and compressed sensing) or maximum-likelihood inference were shown to distinguish epistatic effects from overall non-linearity in genotype–phenotype map structure, while others used patient survival analysis to identify non-linearity.

== See also ==
- Co-adaptation
- Epistasis and functional genomics
- Evolution of sexual reproduction
- Evolvability
- Fitness landscape
- Interactome (Genetic interaction network)
- Mutation
- Pleiotropy
- Quantitative trait locus
- Synthetic lethality
- Synthetic viability
