= Synthetic genetic array =

Synthetic genetic array analysis (SGA) is a high-throughput technique for exploring synthetic lethal and synthetic sick genetic interactions (SSL). SGA allows for the systematic construction of double mutants using a combination of recombinant genetic techniques, mating and selection steps. Using SGA methodology a query gene deletion mutant can be crossed to an entire genome deletion set to identify any SSL interactions, yielding functional information of the query gene and the genes it interacts with. A large-scale application of SGA in which ~130 query genes were crossed to the set of ~5000 viable deletion mutants in yeast revealed a genetic network containing ~1000 genes and ~4000 SSL interactions. The results of this study showed that genes with similar function tend to interact with one another and genes with similar patterns of genetic interactions often encode products that tend to work in the same pathway or complex. Synthetic Genetic Array analysis was initially developed using the model organism S. cerevisiae. This method has since been extended to cover 30% of the S. cerevisiae genome. Methodology has since been developed to allow SGA analysis in S.pombe and E. coli.

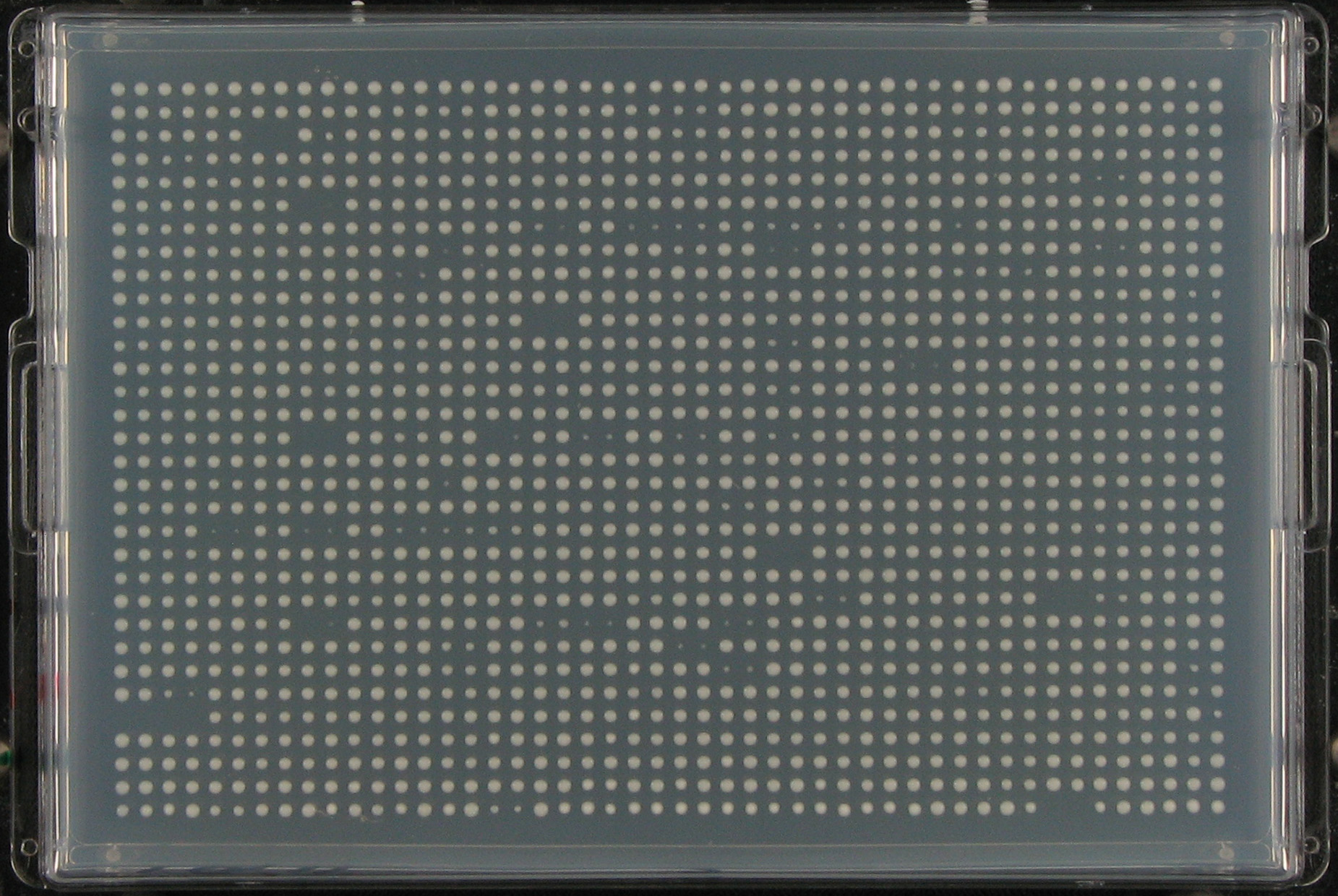
Arrayed yeast showing synthetic lethal interactions. Synthetic lethal interactions are those pairs of colonies with reduced or no growth.

== Background ==
Synthetic genetic array analysis was initially developed by Tong et al. in 2001 and has since been used by many groups working in a wide range of biomedical fields. SGA utilizes the entire genome yeast knock-out set created by the yeast genome deletion project.

== Procedure ==
Synthetic genetic array analysis is generally conducted using colony arrays on petriplates at standard densities (96, 384, 768, 1536). To perform a SGA analysis in S.cerevisiae, the query gene deletion is crossed systematically with a deletion mutant array (DMA) containing every viable knockout ORF of the yeast genome (currently 4786 strains). The resulting diploids are then sporulated by transferring to a media containing reduced nitrogen. The haploid progeny are then put through a series of selection platings and incubations to select for double mutants. The double mutants are screened for SSL interactions visually or using imaging software by assessing the size of the resulting colonies.

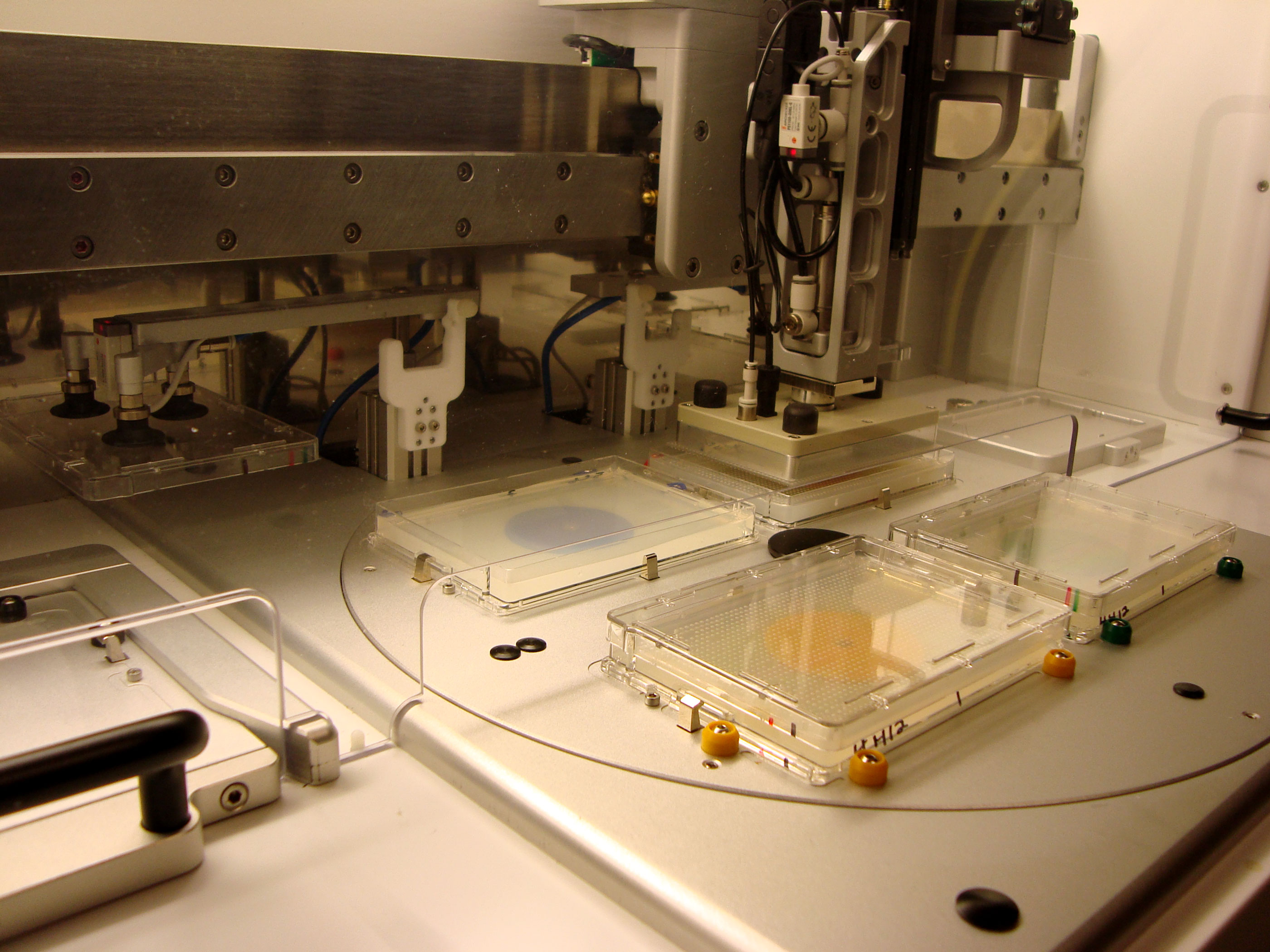
Replicating yeast colonies during SGA analysis using the ROTOR+ High Density Arraying pinning robot (Singer Instruments).

== Robotics ==
Due to the large number of precise replication steps in SGA analysis, robots are widely used to perform the colony manipulations. There are a few systems specifically designed for SGA analysis, which greatly decrease the time to analyse a query gene. Generally these have a series of pins which are used to transfer cells to and from plates, with one system utilizing disposable pads of pins to eliminate washing cycles. Computer programs can be used to analyze the colony sizes from images of the plates thus automating the SGA scoring and chemical-genetics profiling.

== Steps for a yeast high content genome-wide genetic screening system (SGA-road map) ==
There are six major components:

1. Mutant collection
2. Material and tools for handling the mutants
3. Image analysis system
4. Automatic quantification and scoring system
5. Confirmation approaches
6. Data analysis tools

== See also ==
- Tetrad (genetics)
- Yeast two-hybrid
- Synthetic lethality
- Synthetic viability
