= Hypostatic gene =

Gene whose phenotype is altered by a different gene

A hypostatic gene is one whose phenotype is altered by the expression of an allele at a separate locus, in an epistasis event.

Example: In Labrador Retrievers, the chocolate coat colour is a result of homozygosity for a gene that is epistatic to the "black vs. brown" gene. The alleles determining whether the dog is black or brown, are that of the hypostatic gene in this event.

== See also ==
- Epistasis
- Bombay phenotype
