= Tetrad (meiosis) =

Product of meiosis in spore-producing organisms

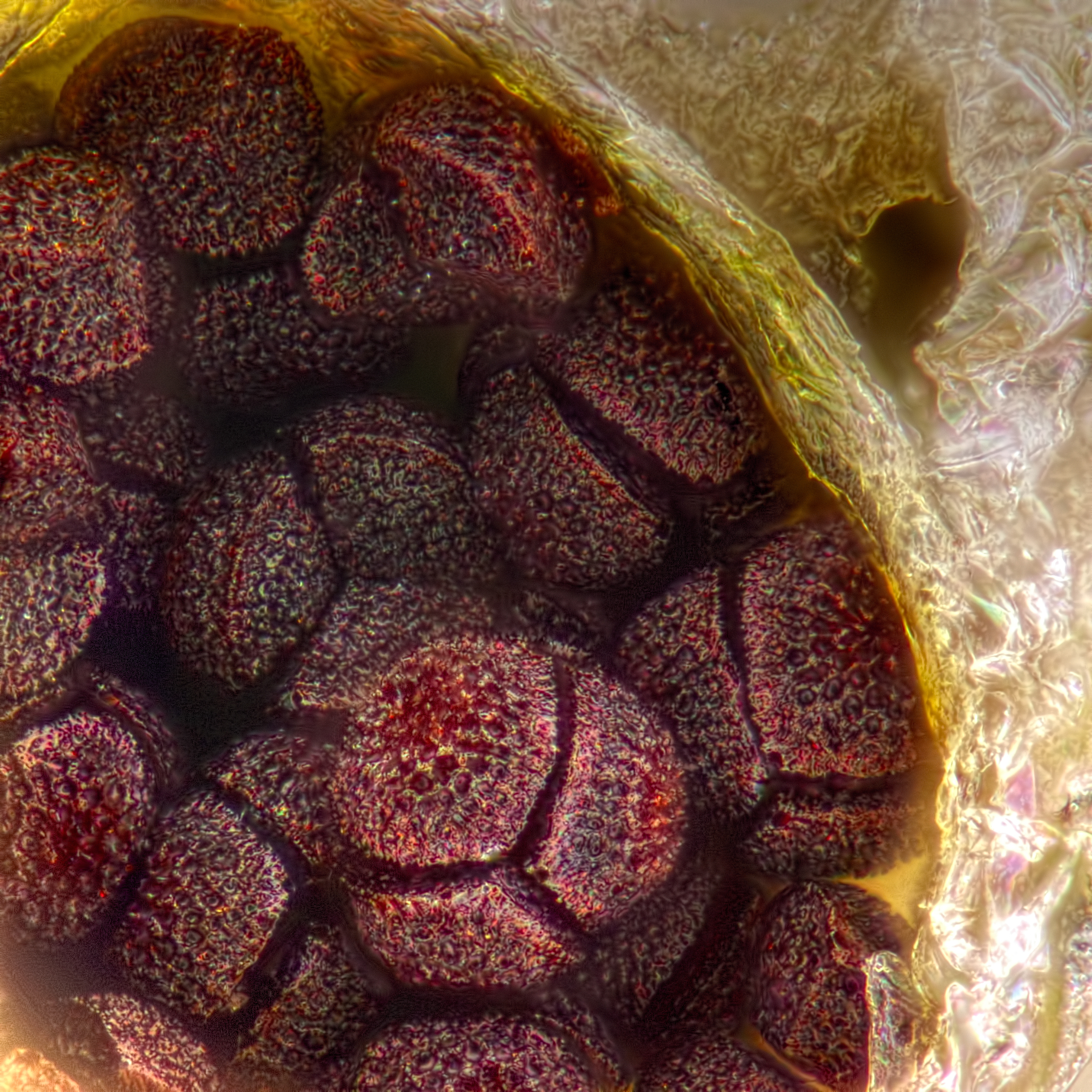
Spores of Riccia sorocarpa still associated in tetrads following meiosis.

The tetrad is the four spores produced after meiosis of a yeast or other Ascomycota, Chlamydomonas or other alga, or a plant. After parent haploids mate, they produce diploids. Under appropriate environmental conditions, diploids sporulate and undergo meiosis. The meiotic products, spores, remain packaged in the parental cell body to produce the tetrad.

== Genetic typification ==
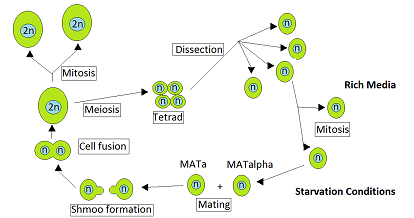
Saccharomyces cerevisiae tetrad

If the two parents have a mutation in two different genes, the tetrad can segregate these genes as the parental ditype (PD), the non-parental ditype (NPD) or as the tetratype (TT).

Parental ditype is a tetrad type containing two different genotypes, both of which are parental. A spore arrangement in ascomycetes that contains only the two non-recombinant-type ascospores.

Non-parental ditype (NPD) is a spore that contains only the two recombinant-type ascospores (assuming two segregating loci). A tetrad type containing two different genotypes, both of which are recombinant.

Tetratype is a tetrad containing four different genotypes, two parental and two recombinant. A spore arrangement in ascomycetes that consists of two parental and two recombinant spores indicates a single crossover between two linked loci.

=== Linkage analysis ===
The ratio between the different segregation types arising after the sporulation is a measure of the linkage between the two genes.

== Tetrad dissection ==
Tetrad dissection has become a powerful tool of yeast geneticists, and is used in conjunction with the many established procedures utilizing the versatility of yeasts as model organisms. Use of modern microscopy and micromanipulation techniques allows the four haploid spores of a yeast tetrad to be separated and germinated individually to form isolated spore colonies.

=== Uses ===
Tetrad analysis can be used to confirm whether a phenotype is caused by a specific mutation, construction of strains, and for investigating gene interaction. Since the frequency of tetrad segregation types is influenced by the recombination frequency for the two markers, the segregation data can be used to calculate the genetic distance between the markers if they are close on the same chromosome. Tetrad analyses have also contributed to detection and study of the phenomena of gene conversion and post-meiotic segregation. These studies have proven central to understanding the mechanism of meiotic recombination, which in turn is a key to understanding the adaptive function of sexual reproduction. The use of tetrads in fine-structure genetic analysis is described in the articles Neurospora crassa and Gene conversion.

=== General procedure ===
Crosses are performed between haploid MATa and MATα mating strains, then the resulting diploids are transferred to sporulation media to form a tetrad containing four haploid spores. Tetrads can then be prepared with Zymolyase, or another enzyme, to digest the wall of the ascus. The spores are then separated with a micromanipulator needle and deposited in separate positions on a petri dish.

=== Tools ===
Traditionally, tetrad dissection has a reputation as "black art". However, instruments have since been developed specifically for tetrad dissection; the most advanced allow easy and semi-automated separation of tetrads. Most micromanipulators use a glass fiber needle to which the spores adhere due to the formation of a water meniscus between the agar and the needle.

== See also ==
- Ascospore
- Ascus
- Genetic recombination
- Homologous recombination
- Saccharomyces cerevisiae
- Synthetic genetic array
