= Synthetic lethality =

Cell death resulting from a deficiency of or interaction between in two or more genes

Synthetic lethality is defined as a type of genetic interaction where the combination of two genetic events results in cell death or death of an organism. Although the foregoing explanation is wider than this, it is common when referring to synthetic lethality to mean the situation arising by virtue of a combination of deficiencies of two or more genes leading to cell death (whether by means of apoptosis or otherwise), whereas a deficiency of only one of these genes does not. In a synthetic lethal genetic screen, it is necessary to begin with a mutation that does not result in cell death, although the effect of that mutation could result in a differing phenotype (slow growth for example), and then systematically test other mutations at additional loci to determine which, in combination with the first mutation, causes cell death arising by way of deficiency or abolition of expression.

Synthetic lethality has utility for purposes of molecular targeted cancer therapy. The first example of a molecular targeted therapeutic agent, which exploited a synthetic lethal approach, arose by means of an inactivated tumor suppressor gene (BRCA1 and 2), a treatment which received FDA approval in 2016 (PARP inhibitor). A sub-case of synthetic lethality, where vulnerabilities are exposed by the deletion of passenger genes rather than tumor suppressor is the so-called "collateral lethality".

== Background ==
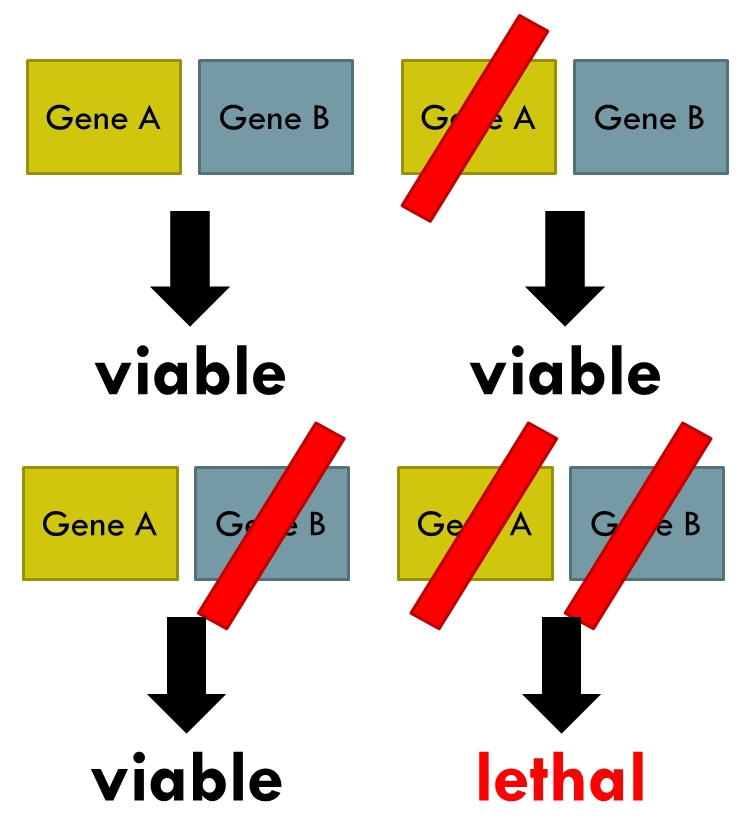
Schematic of basic synthetic lethality. Simultaneous mutations in gene pair confer lethality while any other combination of mutations is viable.

The phenomenon of synthetic lethality was first described by Calvin Bridges in 1922, who noticed that some combinations of mutations in the model organism Drosophila melanogaster (the common fruit fly) confer lethality. Theodore Dobzhansky coined the term "synthetic lethality" in 1946 to describe the same type of genetic interaction in wildtype populations of Drosophila. If the combination of genetic events results in a non-lethal reduction in fitness, the interaction is called synthetic sickness. Although in classical genetics the term synthetic lethality refers to the interaction between two genetic perturbations, synthetic lethality can also apply to cases in which the combination of a mutation and the action of a chemical compound causes lethality, whereas the mutation or compound alone are non-lethal.

Synthetic lethality is a consequence of the tendency of organisms to maintain buffering schemes (i.e. backup plans) which engender phenotypic stability notwithstanding underlying genetic variations, environmental changes or other random events, such as mutations. This genetic robustness is the result of parallel redundant pathways and "capacitor" proteins that camouflage the effects of mutations so that important cellular processes do not depend on any individual component. Synthetic lethality can help identify these buffering relationships, and what type of disease or malfunction that may occur when these relationships break down, through the identification of gene interactions that function in either the same biochemical process or pathways that appear to be unrelated.

== High-throughput screens ==
High-throughput synthetic lethal screens may help illuminate questions about how cellular processes work without previous knowledge of gene function or interaction. Screening strategy must take into account the organism used for screening, the mode of genetic perturbation, and whether the screen is forward or reverse. Many of the first synthetic lethal screens were performed in Saccharomyces cerevisiae. Budding yeast has many experimental advantages in screens, including a small genome, fast doubling time, both haploid and diploid states, and ease of genetic manipulation. Gene ablation can be performed using a PCR-based strategy and complete libraries of knockout collections for all annotated yeast genes are publicly available. Synthetic genetic array (SGA), synthetic lethality by microarray (SLAM), and genetic interaction mapping (GIM) are three high-throughput methods for analyzing synthetic lethality in yeast. A genome scale genetic interaction map was created by SGA analysis in S. cerevisiae that comprises about 75% of all yeast genes.

== Collateral lethality ==
Collateral lethality is a sub-case of synthetic lethality in personalized cancer therapy, where vulnerabilities are exposed by the deletion of passenger genes rather than tumor suppressor genes, which are deleted by virtue of chromosomal proximity to major deleted tumor suppressor loci.

== DDR deficiencies ==
=== DNA mismatch repair deficiency ===
Mutations in genes employed in DNA mismatch repair (MMR) cause a high mutation rate. In tumors, such frequent subsequent mutations often generate "non-self" immunogenic antigens. A human Phase II clinical trial, with 41 patients, evaluated one synthetic lethal approach for tumors with or without MMR defects. In the case of sporadic tumors evaluated, the majority would be deficient in MMR due to epigenetic repression of an MMR gene. The product of gene PD-1 ordinarily represses cytotoxic immune responses. Inhibition of this gene allows a greater immune response. In this Phase II clinical trial with 47 patients, when cancer patients with a defect in MMR in their tumors were exposed to an inhibitor of PD-1, 67% - 78% of patients experienced immune-related progression-free survival. In contrast, for patients without defective MMR, addition of PD-1 inhibitor generated only 11% of patients with immune-related progression-free survival. Thus inhibition of PD-1 is primarily synthetically lethal with MMR defects.

=== Werner syndrome gene deficiency ===
The analysis of 630 human primary tumors in 11 tissues shows that WRN promoter hypermethylation (with loss of expression of WRN protein) is a common event in tumorigenesis. The WRN gene promoter is hypermethylated in about 38% of colorectal cancers and non-small-cell lung carcinomas and in about 20% or so of stomach cancers, prostate cancers, breast cancers, non-Hodgkin lymphomas and chondrosarcomas, plus at significant levels in the other cancers evaluated. The WRN helicase protein is important in homologous recombinational DNA repair and also has roles in non-homologous end joining DNA repair and base excision DNA repair.

Topoisomerase inhibitors are frequently used as chemotherapy for different cancers, though they cause bone marrow suppression, are cardiotoxic and have variable effectiveness. A 2006 retrospective study, with long clinical follow-up, was made of colon cancer patients treated with the topoisomerase inhibitor irinotecan. In this study, 45 patients had hypermethylated WRN gene promoters and 43 patients had unmethylated WRN gene promoters. Irinitecan was more strongly beneficial for patients with hypermethylated WRN promoters (39.4 months survival) than for those with unmethylated WRN promoters (20.7 months survival). Thus, a topoisomerase inhibitor appeared to be synthetically lethal with deficient expression of WRN. Further evaluations have also indicated synthetic lethality of deficient expression of WRN and topoisomerase inhibitors.

=== Clinical and preclinical PARP1 inhibitor synthetic lethality ===
As reviewed by Murata et al., five different PARP1 inhibitors are now undergoing Phase I, II and III clinical trials, to determine if particular PARP1 inhibitors are synthetically lethal in a large variety of cancers, including those in the prostate, pancreas, non-small-cell lung tumors, lymphoma, multiple myeloma, and Ewing sarcoma. In addition, in preclinical studies using cells in culture or within mice, PARP1 inhibitors are being tested for synthetic lethality against epigenetic and mutational deficiencies in about 20 DNA repair defects beyond BRCA1/2 deficiencies. These include deficiencies in PALB2, FANCD2, RAD51, ATM, MRE11, p53, XRCC1 and LSD1.

=== Preclinical ARID1A synthetic lethality ===
ARID1A, a chromatin modifier, is required for non-homologous end joining, a major pathway that repairs double-strand breaks in DNA, and also has transcription regulatory roles. ARID1A mutations are one of the 12 most common carcinogenic mutations. Mutation or epigenetically decreased expression of ARID1A has been found in 17 types of cancer. Pre-clinical studies in cells and in mice show that synthetic lethality for deficient ARID1A expression occurs by either inhibition of the methyltransferase activity of EZH2, by inhibition of the DNA repair kinase ATR, or by exposure to the kinase inhibitor dasatinib.

=== Preclinical RAD52 synthetic lethality ===
There are two pathways for homologous recombinational repair of double-strand breaks. The major pathway depends on BRCA1, PALB2 and BRCA2 while an alternative pathway depends on RAD52. Pre-clinical studies, involving epigenetically reduced or mutated BRCA-deficient cells (in culture or injected into mice), show that inhibition of RAD52 is synthetically lethal with BRCA-deficiency.

== Side effects ==
Although treatments using synthetic lethality can stop or slow progression of cancers and prolong survival, each of the synthetic lethal treatments has some adverse side effects. For example, more than 20% of patients treated with an inhibitor of PD-1 encounter fatigue, rash, pruritus, cough, diarrhea, decreased appetite, constipation or arthralgia. Thus, it is important to determine which DDR deficiency is present, so that only an effective synthetic lethal treatment can be applied, and not unnecessarily subject patients to adverse side effects without a direct benefit.

== See also ==
- Synthetic genetic array
- Synthetic rescue
- Essential gene
