= Synthetic rescue =

Synthetic rescue (or synthetic recovery or synthetic viability when a lethal phenotype is rescued) is a genetic interaction in which a cell that is nonviable, sensitive to a specific drug, or otherwise impaired due to the presence of a genetic mutation becomes viable when the original mutation is combined with a second mutation in a different gene. The second mutation can either be a loss-of-function mutation (equivalent to a knockout) or a gain-of-function mutation.

The term synthetic rescue is derived from synthetic lethality, where the combination of two mutations leads to cell death (whereas neither alone is lethal). Synthetic rescue is the inverse process: instead of causing lethality, the second genetic change rescues the organism from the harmful effects of the first.

This phenomenon occurs in the yeast Saccharomyces cerevisiae, wherein a deletion of the DNA helicase gene SRS2 compensates for the lethality and DNA repair defects caused by the loss of the RAD54 gene.

Synthetic rescue provides insight into the function of the genes involved in intragenic interactions. Synthetic rescue could also potentially be exploited for gene therapy.

== Types of genetic suppression relevant to synthetic rescue ==
=== Dosage-mediated suppression ===
Overexpression of a gene compensates for a loss-of-function mutation, for example, extra HIS4 copies rescuing his4 auxotrophy in yeast.

=== Intergenic suppression ===
A mutation in one gene compensates for another, for example; SRS2 deletion rescuing rad54Δ lethality in yeast.

=== Bypass suppression ===
A suppressor mutation activates an alternative pathway to bypass a defect, for example; EXO1 deletion rescuing cdc13-1 by halting telomere degradation in mutant yeast.

== Potential exploitations of synthetic rescue ==
=== Cancer Therapy ===
Synthetic rescue principles underpin PARP inhibitor treatments in BRCA-deficient cancers. While PARP inhibition is synthetic lethal with BRCA loss, synthetic rescue interactions such as 53BP1 deletion restoring viability reveal resistance mechanisms and alternative targets.

=== Biotech & Synthetic Biology ===
- Engineered Redundancy: One study introduced an engineered mutation in an industrial yeast strain with redundant pathways ADH2 rescue of thermal sensitive yeast with defect in sterol metabolism to improve metabolic engineering robustness.
- Targeting Antibiotic Resistance: Another study found E. coli with recA deletions are rescued by lexA mutations, informing strategies to combat resistance by targeting compensatory networks like lexA mutations.

== Industry and research initiatives ==
Synthetic rescue was engineered in E.coli by deleting sdhA and compensating with mutations in icd for the purpose of rescuing lethal metabolic pathways with the goal of expanding the scope of genome-scale engineering and developing platform technologies for sustainable biochemical production.

== See also ==
- Complex networks
- Gene therapy
- Suppressor mutation
- Synthetic lethality
