= Suppressor mutation =

Type of mutation

A suppressor mutation is a second mutation that alleviates or reverts the phenotypic effects of an already existing mutation in a process defined synthetic rescue. Genetic suppression therefore restores the phenotype seen prior to the original background mutation. Suppressor mutations are useful for identifying new genetic sites which affect a biological process of interest. They also provide evidence between functionally interacting molecules and intersecting biological pathways.

== Intragenic vs. intergenic suppression ==
=== Intragenic suppression ===
Intragenic suppression results from suppressor mutations that occur in the same gene as the original mutation. In a classic study, Francis Crick (et al.) used intragenic suppression to study the fundamental nature of the genetic code. From this study it was shown that genes are expressed as non-overlapping triplets (codons).

Researchers showed that mutations caused by either a single base insertion (+) or a single base deletion (-) could be "suppressed" or restored by a second mutation of the opposite sign, as long as the two mutations occurred in the same vicinity of the gene. This led to the conclusion that genes needed to be read in a specific "reading frame" and a single base insertion or deletion would shift the reading frame (frameshift mutation) in such a way that the remaining DNA would code for a different polypeptide than the one intended. Therefore, researchers concluded that the second mutation of opposite sign suppresses the original mutation by restoring the reading frame, as long as the portion between the two mutations is not critical for protein function.

In addition to the reading frame, Crick also used suppressor mutations to determine codon size. It was found that while one and two base insertions/deletions of the same sign resulted in a mutant phenotype, deleting or inserting three bases could give a wild type phenotype. From these results it was concluded that an inserted or deleted triplet does not disturb the reading frame and the genetic code is in fact a triplet.

=== Intergenic suppression ===
Intergenic (also known as extragenic) suppression relieves the effects of a mutation in one gene by a mutation somewhere else within the genome. The second mutation is not on the same gene as the original mutation. Intergenic suppression is useful for identifying and studying interactions between molecules, such as proteins. For example, a mutation which disrupts the complementary interaction between protein molecules may be compensated for by a second mutation elsewhere in the genome that restores or provides a suitable alternative interaction between those molecules. Several proteins of biochemical, signal transduction, and gene expression pathways have been identified using this approach. Examples of such pathways include receptor-ligand interactions as well as the interaction of components involved in DNA replication, transcription, and translation.

These Intergenic suppressions are also likely to persist in the population. When these compensatory mutations are established in organisms like E. coli making it resistant to the drug due to the presence of a drug, and the drug usage is halted, the resistant strains are not easily able to evolve back into strains that can then once again be sensitive to the drug they had incurred resistance to. These strains are likely not subject to losing these compensatory mutations and which would greatly decrease the fitness in the strain resulting in the intermediate strains. These intermediate strains are subjected to bottlenecking and thus making it difficult for the alleles to be reverted prior to Intergenic suppressions. Consequently, when drugs are halted it can be seen that these mutations are likely to persist in the population.

Tevenphage

Suppressor mutations also occur in genes that code for virus structural proteins. To create a viable phage T4 virus (see image), a balance of structural components is required. An amber mutant of phage T4 contains a mutation that changes a codon for an amino acid in a protein to the nonsense stop codon TAG (see stop codon and nonsense mutation). If, upon infection, an amber mutant defective in a gene encoding a needed structural component of phage T4 is weakly suppressed (in an E. coli host containing a specific altered tRNA – see nonsense suppressor), it will produce a reduced number of the needed structural component. As a consequence few if any viable phage are formed. However, it was found that viable phage could sometimes be produced in the host with the weak nonsense suppressor if a second amber mutation in a gene that encodes another structural protein is also present in the phage genome. It was found that the reason the second amber mutation could suppress the first one is that the two numerically reduced structural proteins would now be in balance. For instance, if the first amber mutation caused a reduction of tail fibers to one tenth the normal level, most phage particles produced would have insufficient tail fibers to be infective. However, if a second amber mutation is defective in a base plate component and causes one tenth the number of base plates to be made, this may restore the balance of tail fibers and base plates, and thus allow infective phage to be produced.

== Revertant ==
In microbial genetics, a revertant is a mutant that has reverted to its former genotype or to the original phenotype by means of a suppressor mutation, or else by compensatory mutation somewhere in the gene (second site reversion).

== See also ==
- Synthetic viability
