= Amorph =

Amorph may refer to:

- Amorph (gene), a type of mutated allele

== See also ==
- Amorphous solid
- Amorpha, a genus of plants in the pea family
- Amorpha juglandis, in the monotypic moth genus Amorpha
- Amorphae, a 2016 album by Ben Monder
- Amorphea, or unikonts, a taxonomic supergroup of eukaryotes
- Amorpheae, a monophyletic clade of the flowering plant subfamily Faboideae
