= Somatic mutation =

Type of mutation on somatic cell

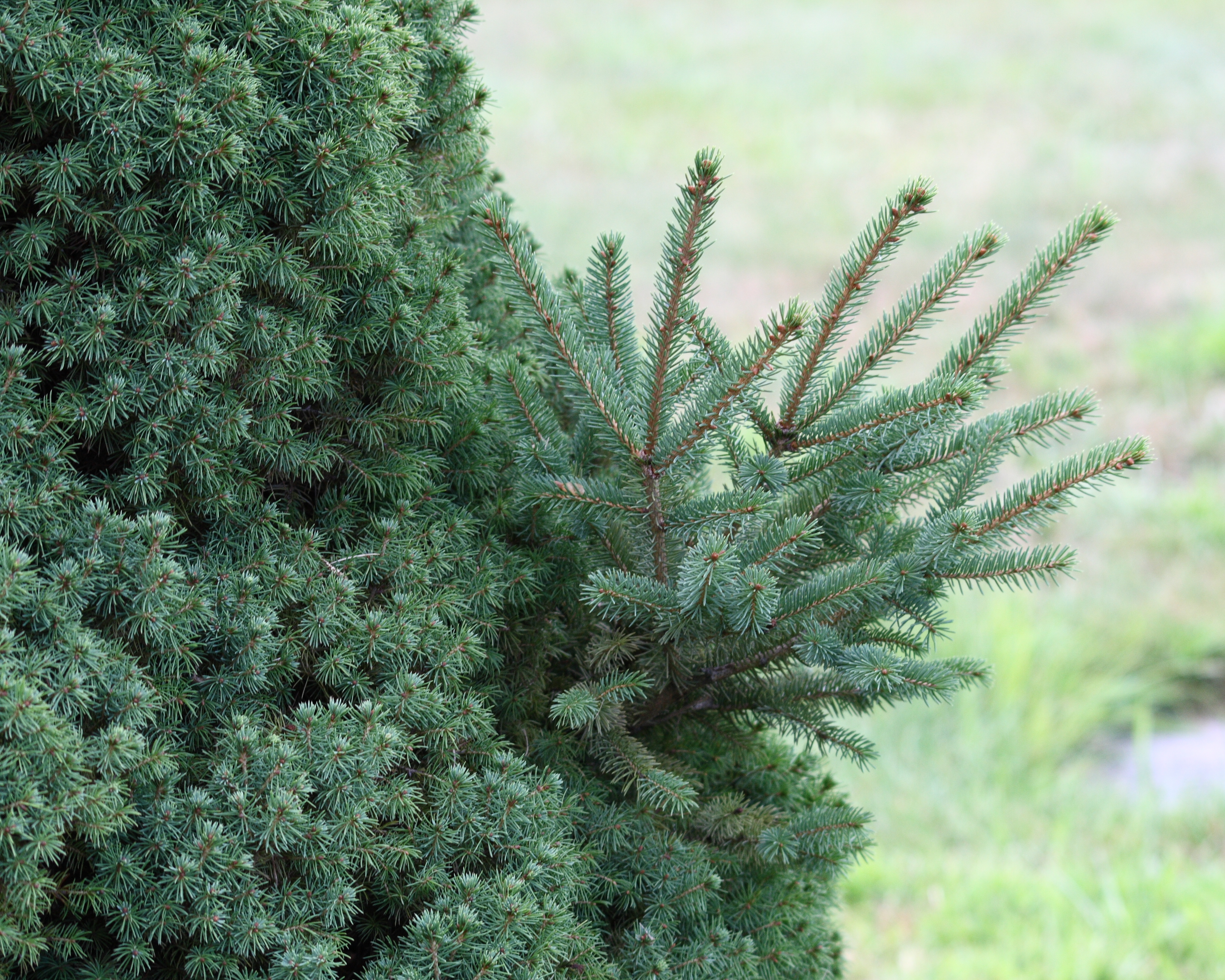
A somatic mutation in one branch of this ornamental spruce has resulted in bigger and more widely spaced needles.

A somatic mutation is a change in the DNA sequence of a somatic cell of a multicellular organism with dedicated reproductive cells; that is, any mutation that occurs in a cell other than a gamete or germ cell (a cell that produce gametes).

Unlike germline mutations, which can be passed down to offspring, somatic mutations are not usually passed down to offspring. However, in certain organisms it is possible for somatic mutations to be transmitted to the next generation: for instance in plants (as plants lack a dedicated germline), or in animals that reproduce by budding, such as sea anemones.

While somatic mutations might not be transmitted to an organism's offspring, somatic mutations will be present in all descendants of a cell within the same organism. Many cancers are the result of accumulated somatic mutations.

== Fraction of cells affected ==
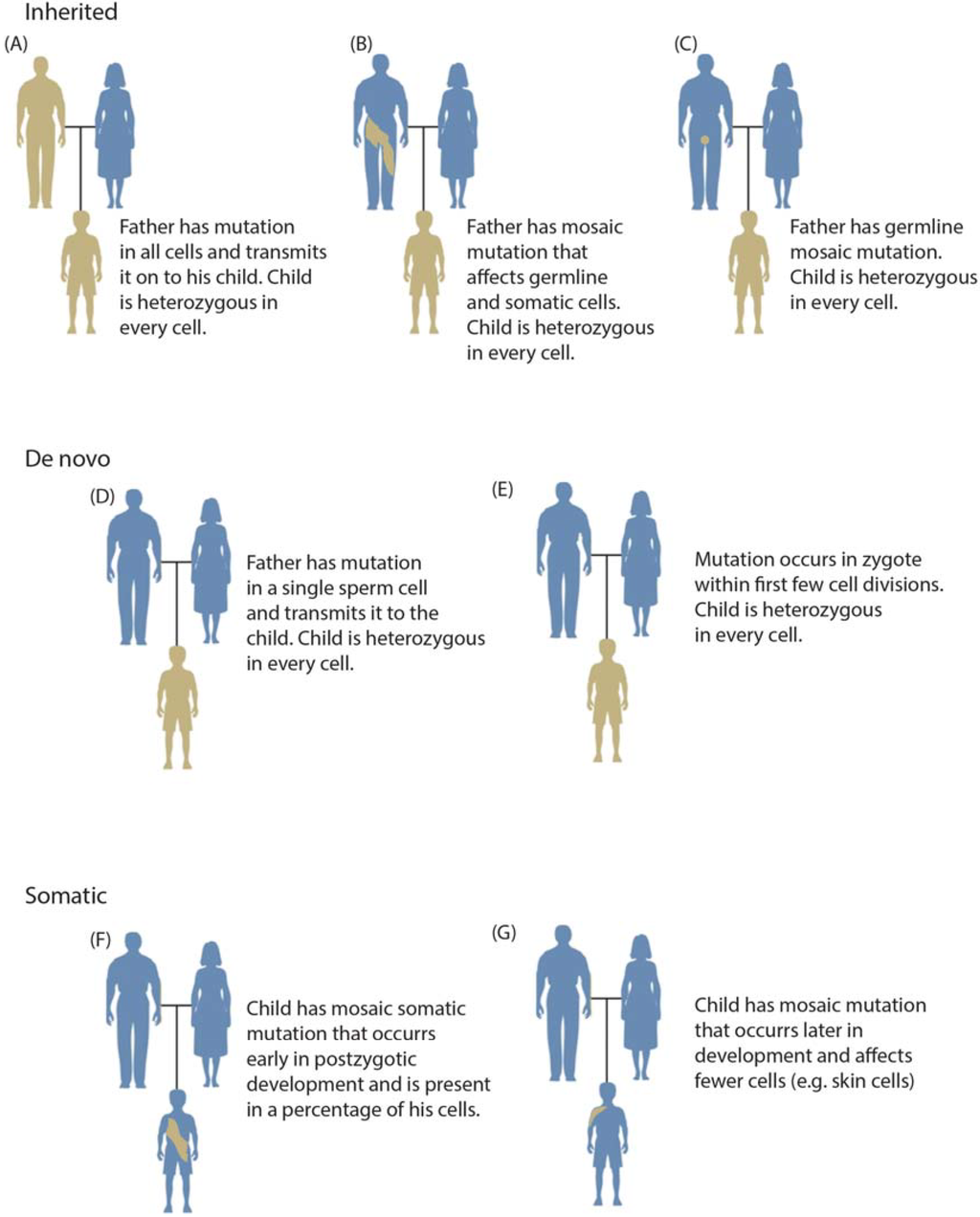
Somatic mutations that occur earlier in embryonic development are generally present in a larger fraction of body cells. In F), the mutation happened earlier in development than in G), and therefore is present in more of the child's cells.

The term somatic generally refers to the cells of the body, in contrast to the reproductive (germline) cells, which give rise to the egg or sperm. For example, in mammals, somatic cells make up the internal organs, skin, bones, blood, and connective tissue.

In most animals, including humans, separation of germ cells from somatic cells (germline development) occurs very early in embryonic development. Once this segregation has occurred in the embryo, any mutation outside of the germline cells can not be passed down to an organism's offspring.

However, somatic mutations are passed down to all the progeny of a mutated cell within the same organism. A major section of an organism therefore might carry the same mutation, especially if that mutation occurs at earlier stages of development. Somatic mutations that occur later in an organism's life can be hard to detect, as they may affect only a single cell—for instance, a post-mitotic neuron; improvements in single cell sequencing are therefore an important tool for the study of somatic mutation. Both the nuclear DNA and mitochondrial DNA of a cell can accumulate mutations; somatic mitochondrial mutations have been implicated in development of some neurodegenerative diseases.

=== Exceptions to inheritance ===
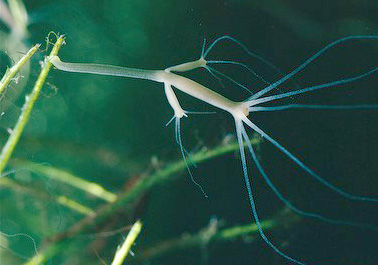
Hydra oligactis with two buds. Reproduction by budding is an exception to the rule that somatic mutations can not be inherited.

There are many exceptions to the rule that somatic mutations cannot be inherited by offspring. Many organisms (such as plants and basal animals like sponges and corals) do not dedicate a separate germline during early development. Instead they make gametes from stem cells in adult somatic tissues. In flowering plants, for example, germ cells can arise from adult somatic cells in the floral meristem. Other animals without a designated germ line include tunicates and flatworms.

Somatic mutations can also be passed down to offspring in organisms that can reproduce asexually, without production of gametes. For instance, animals in the cnidarian genus Hydra can reproduce asexually through the mechanism of budding (they can also reproduce sexually). In hydra, a new bud develops directly from somatic cells of the parent hydra. A mutation present in the tissue that gives rise to the daughter organism would be passed down to that offspring.

Many plants naturally reproduce through vegetative reproduction—growth of a new plant from a fragment of the parent plant, without the step of seed production. This can propagate somatic mutations. Humans can induce vegetative reproduction via grafting and stem cuttings, which is used for crops like apples to grow a single cultivar. Inherited somatic mutations can be seen in variations between generations of "Red Delicious" apples that were produced by grafting.

== Causes ==
UV light can damage DNA by causing pyrimidine dimers. Adjacent bases bond with each other, instead of across the "ladder". The distorted DNA molecule does not function properly. Mutation can result if mistakes occur in DNA repair or replication.

As with germline mutations, mutations in somatic cells may arise due to endogenous factors, including errors during DNA replication and repair, and exposure to reactive oxygen species produced by normal cellular processes. Mutations can also be induced by contact with mutagens, which can increase the rate of mutation.

Most mutagens act by causing DNA damage—alterations in DNA structure such as pyrimidine dimers, or breakage of one or both DNA strands. DNA repair processes can remove DNA damages that would, otherwise, upon DNA replication, cause mutation. Mutation results from damage when mistakes in the mechanism of DNA repair cause changes in the nucleotide sequence, or if replication occurs before repair is complete.

Mutagens can be physical, such as radiation from UV rays and X-rays, or chemical—molecules that interact directly with DNA—such as metabolites of benzo[a]pyrene, a potent carcinogen found in tobacco smoke. Mutagens associated with cancers are often studied to learn about cancer and its prevention.

== Mutation frequency ==
Research suggests that the frequency of mutations is generally higher in somatic cells than in cells of the germline; furthermore, there are differences in the types of mutation seen in the germ and in the soma. There is variation in mutation frequency between different somatic tissues within the same organism and between species.

Milholland et al. (2017) examined the mutation rate of dermal fibroblasts (a type of somatic cell) and germline cells in humans and in mice. They measured the rate of single nucleotide variants (SNVs), most of which are a consequence of replication error. Both in terms of mutational load (total mutations present in a cell) and mutation rate per cell division (new mutations with each mitosis), somatic mutation rates were more than ten times that of the germline, in humans and in mice.

In humans, mutation load in fibroblasts was over twenty times greater than germline (2.8 × 10^{−7} compared with 1.2 × 10^{−8} mutations per base pair). Adjusted for differences in the estimated number of cell divisions, the fibroblast mutation rate was about 80 times greater than the germ (respectively, 2.66 × 10^{−9} vs. 3.3 × 10^{−11} mutations per base pair per mitosis).

The disparity in mutation rate between the germline and somatic tissues likely reflects the greater importance of genetic integrity in the germline than in the soma. Variation in mutation frequency may be due to differences in rates of DNA damage or to differences in the DNA repair process as a result of elevated levels of DNA repair enzymes.

In April 2022 it has been reported that most mammals have about the same number of mutations by the time they reach the end of their lifespan, so those that have similar lifespan will have similar somatic mutation rates and those who live less/more will have a higher/lower rate of somatic mutations respectively.

=== Neurons ===
Post-mitotic neurons accumulate somatic mutations at a constant rate throughout life, and this rate is roughly similar to the mutation rates of mitotically active tissues. The mutations in neurons may arise as a consequence of endogenous DNA damage and the somewhat inaccurate repair of such damage that occurs all the time in cells.

=== Somatic hypermutation ===
As a part of the adaptive immune response, antibody-producing B cells experience a mutation rate many times higher than the normal rate of mutation. The mutation rate in antigen-binding coding sequences of the immunoglobulin genes is up to 1,000,000 times higher than in cell lines outside the lymphoid system. A major step in affinity maturation, somatic hypermutation helps B cells produce antibodies with greater antigen affinity.

== Disease ==
Somatic mutations accumulate within an organism's cells as it ages and with each round of cell division; the role of somatic mutations in the development of cancer is well established, and the accumulation of somatic mutations is implicated in the biology of aging.

Mutations in neuronal stem cells (especially during neurogenesis) and in post-mitotic neurons lead to genomic heterogeneity of neurons—referred to as "somatic brain mosaicism". The accumulation of age-related mutations in neurons may be linked to neurodegenerative diseases, including Alzheimer's disease, but the association is unproven. The majority of central-nervous system cells in the adult are post-mitotic, and adult mutations might affect only a single neuron. Unlike in cancer, where mutations result in clonal proliferation, detrimental somatic mutations might contribute to neurodegenerative disease by cell death. Accurate assessment of somatic mutation burden in neurons therefore remains difficult to assess.

=== Role in carcinogenesis ===
If a mutation occurs in a cell of an organism, that mutation will be present in all the descendants of this cell within the same organism. The accumulation of certain mutations over generations of somatic cells is part of the process of malignant transformation, from normal cell to cancer cell.

Cells with heterozygous loss-of-function mutations (one good copy of a gene and one mutated copy) may function normally with the unmutated copy until the good copy has been spontaneously somatically mutated. This kind of mutation happens often in living organisms, but it is difficult to measure the rate. Measuring this rate is important in predicting the rate at which people may develop cancer.

== See also ==
- Mosaic (genetics)
- Human somatic variation
