= Amorph (gene) =

Type of mutated allele

An amorph is a mutated allele that has lost the ability of the parent allele (whether wild type or any other type) to encode any functional protein. An amorph mutation, or null, is the loss of genetic information for the synthesis of appropriate mRNA. Depending on the relationships of the parent allele, an amorphous mutant can have various forms of gene interactions.

The term "amorph" was used by Hermann Joseph Muller in 1932.

== See also ==
- Allele
- Gene mutation
- Muller's morphs
