= Replication timing quantitative trait loci =

Genetic variations

Replication timing quantitative trait loci (or rtQTL) are genetic variations that lead to differential use of replication origins, exhibiting allele-specific effects on replication timing. Originally, 16 rtQTL were identified in an analysis of human genomes.
