= Plasmid copy number =

Number of copies of a plasmid in a cell

In cellular biology, the plasmid copy number is the number of copies of a given plasmid in a cell. To ensure survival and thus the continued propagation of the plasmid, they must regulate their copy number. If a plasmid has too high of a copy number, they may excessively burden their host by occupying too much cellular machinery and using too much energy. On the other hand, too low of a copy number may result in the plasmid not being present in all of their host's progeny. Plasmids may be either low, medium or high copy number plasmids; the regulation mechanisms between low and medium copy number plasmids are different. Low copy plasmids (5 or less copies per host) require either a partitioning system or a toxin-antitoxin pair such as CcdA/CcdB to ensure that each daughter receives the plasmid. For example, the F plasmid, which is the origin of BACs (bacterial artificial chromosomes) is a single copy plasmid with a partitioning system encoded in an operon right next to the plasmid origin. The partitioning system interacts with the septation apparatus to ensure that each daughter receives a copy of the plasmid. Many biotechnology applications utilize mutated plasmids that replicate to high copy number. For example, pBR322 is a medium copy number plasmid (~20 copies/cell) from which several high copy number cloning vectors (>100 copies/cell) have been derived by mutagenesis, such as the well known pUC series. This delivers the convenience of high plasmid DNA yields but the additional burden of the high copy number restricts the plasmid size. Larger high copy plasmids (>30kb) are disfavoured and also prone to size reduction through deletional mutagenesis.

== Regulation ==
Medium copy number plasmids, also called relaxed plasmids, require a system to ensure that replication is inhibited once the number of plasmids in the cell reaches a certain threshold. Relaxed plasmids are generally regulated through one of two mechanisms: antisense RNA or iteron binding groups. Low copy number plasmids, also called stringent plasmids, require tighter control of replication.

=== ColE1 derived plasmids: Antisense RNA ===
In ColE1 derived plasmids, replication is primarily regulated through a small plasmid-encoded RNA called RNA I. A single promoter initiates replication in ColE1: the RNA II promoter. The RNA II transcript forms a stable RNA-DNA hybrid with the DNA template strand near the origin of replication, where it is then processed by RNaseH to produce the 3' OH primer that DNA polymerase I uses to initiate leading strand DNA synthesis. RNA I serves as a major plasmid-encoded inhibitor of this process whose concentration is proportional to plasmid copy number. RNA I is exactly complementary to the 5' end of the RNA II (because it is transcribed from the opposite strand of the same region of DNA as RNA II). RNA I and RNA IIled a kissing complex. The kissing complex is stabilized by a protein called Rop (repressor of primer) and a double-stranded RNA-I/RNA-II RNA duplex is formed. This altered shape prevents RNA II from hybridizing to the DNA and being processed from RNaseH to produce the primer necessary for initiation of plasmid replication. More RNA I is produced as the plasmid concentration increases, which increasingly inhibits replication, resulting in regulation of copy number.

=== R1 and ColIb-p9 Plasmids: Antisense RNA ===
Most plasmids require a plasmid-encoded protein, usually called Rep, to separate the strands of DNA at the origin of replication (oriV) to initiate DNA replication. Rep binds to specific DNA sequences in oriV which are unique to a plasmid type. The synthesis of Rep protein is controlled in order to limit plasmid replication and therefore regulate copy number. In R1 plasmids RepA can be transcribed from two different promoters. It is made from the first promoter until the plasmid reaches its copy number, upon which the protein CopB represses this primary promoter. RepA expression is also regulated post-transcriptionally from the secondary promoter by an antisense RNA called CopA. CopA interacts with its RNA target in the RepA mRNA and forms a kissing complex and then a RNA-RNA duplex. The resultant double stranded RNA is cleaved by RNase III, preventing synthesis of RepA. The higher the concentration of the plasmid, the more CopA RNA is produced and the less RepA protein can be synthesized, increasing inhibition of plasmid replication.

=== Col1b-P9: Antisense RNA ===
Replication of the low-copy-number ColIb-P9 depends upon Rep, which is produced by expression of the repZ gene. repZ expression requires formation of a pseudoknot in the mRNA. repZ is repressed by a small antisense Inc RNA, which binds to repZ mRNA, forms an Inc RNA-mRNA duplex, and prevents formation of the pseudoknot to inhibit repZ translation into Rep. In this event, replication can no longer occur.

=== pSC101: Iteron plasmid ===
Iteron plasmids, including F and RK2-related plasmids, have oriV regions containing multiple (~3-7) repeats of 17-22 bp iteron sequences. pSC101 represents a simple model of an iteron plasmid. Iteron plasmids control copy number through two combined methods, suitable for low copy number stringent plasmids. One method is control of RepA synthesis. RepA is the only plasmid-encoded protein required for replication in pSC101. RepA protein represses its own synthesis by binding to its own promoter region and blocking transcription of itself (transcriptional autoregulation). Thus, the more RepA is made, the more its synthesis is repressed, and subsequently limiting plasmid replication. The coupling hypothesis proposes that the second method is coupling of plasmids through the Rep protein and iteron sequences. When the plasmid concentration is high, RepA plasmids bound to iterons form dimers in between two plasmids, "handcuffing" them at the origin of replication and inhibiting replication.

== Incompatibility ==
Plasmids can be incompatible if they share the same replication control mechanism. Under these circumstances, both plasmids contribute to the total copy number and are regulated together. They are not recognized as distinct plasmids. As such, it becomes much more likely that one of the plasmids may be out-copied by the other and lost during cell division (the cell is "cured" of the plasmid). This is particularly likely with low copy number plasmids. Plasmids can also be incompatible due to shared partitioning systems.
