= Archaeoglobus profundus =

Scientific classification
- Domain: Archaea
- Kingdom: Methanobacteriati
- Phylum: Methanobacteriota
- Class: Archaeoglobi
- Order: Archaeoglobales
- Family: Archaeoglobaceae
- Genus: Archaeoglobus
- Species: A. profundus

Binomial name
- Archaeoglobus profundus Burggraf et al., 1990

Archaeoglobus profundus is a sulphate-reducing archaea. Archaeoglobus can be found in high-temperature oil fields where it may contribute to oil field souring. A. profundus grows lithotrophically, and while it needs acetate and CO_{2} for biosynthesis it is heterotrophic.

== Discovery & Classification ==
A. profundus was first described in 1990 by Burggraf and colleagues during the investigations of microorganisms that showed the inhabiting high temperature marine environments. The organism was isolated from the hydrothermal marine systems, where the extreme heat and anaerobic conditions supported the specialized microbial communities.

The species was eventually identified through a combination of physiological and biochemical analyses, which included the evaluation of its metabolic capabilities, sulfate-reducing activities, and growth conditions. Subsequent genomic studies further classified the metabolic pathways and evolutionary relationships with the other archaeal species.

A. profundus is a hyperthermophilic archaeon is classified within the domain Archaea, kingdom Methanobacteriati formally known as Euryarchaeota, and phylum Methanobacteriota. It is a group known for containing extremophilic microorganisms that adapted to high temperature and anaerobic environments. Within the phylum, it belongs to the class Archaeoglobi, order Archaeoglobales, and family Archaeoglobaceae, which includes the sulfate reducing archaea that is commonly found in hydrothermal systems.

The members of the genus Archaeoglobus are distinguished by their ability to perform the sulfate reduction process under the strictly anaerobic conditions. This is done by using sulfate as a terminal electron acceptor. Their metabolic capability is a defining characteristic of their lineage and plays a key role in biogeochemical sulfur cycling in these extreme environment.

Phylogenetically, A. profundus is closely related to the other species that are within the genus. This includes A. fulgidus and A. lithotrophicus, which share similar thermophilic and anaerobic growth characteristics. Comparative genomic analysis has also revealed that conserved genes that are involved in energy metabolism and stress adaptation, support their evolutionary relationship and common ecological niche in the high temperature environments.

== Taxonomy & Phylogeny ==
A. profundus is a hyperthermophilic archaeon belonging to the domain Archaea, kingdom Methanobacteriati, formally known as Euryarchaeota, and phylum Methanobacteriota. It is classified within the class of Archaeoglobi, order Archaeoglobales, and family Archaeoglobaceae. Members of the genus Archaeoglobus are characterized by their ability to reduce sulfate that is under strictly anaerobic conditions. These organisms are usually found in extreme environments. These extreme environments include geothermal oil reservoirs and deep-sea hydrothermal vents.

A. profundus is phylogenetically closely related to other members of the genus, particularly Archaeoglobus fulgidus, which is considered its nearest neighbor. This relationship has been established through 16S rRNA gene sequencing and comparative genomic analysis, which show strong similarities in genetic sequences and metabolic pathways.

Closely related species, including Archaeoglobus lithotrophicus, share similar thermophilic and anaerobic growth characteristics, as well as the ability to reduce sulfate at high temperatures. Comparative genomic studies have identified conserved genes involved in energy metabolism and stress adaptation, further supporting their evolutionary relationship and shared ecological niche in high-temperature environments.

Subsequent genomic and phylogenetic studies have helped clarify the metabolic pathways and evolutionary relationships of A. profundus within the archaeal domain.

== Morphology and Physiology ==
A. profundus is mainly anaerobic and often exhibits optimal growth at elevated temperatures which are commonly found in hydrothermal environments. It obtains energy through degradative sulfate reduction, by using sulfate as a terminal electron acceptor and producing hydrogen sulfide as a metabolic byproduct. This metabolic process plays a significant role in the sulfur cycling that takes place in extreme ecosystems.

Physiologically, A. profundus is known to adapt and survive in environments which are high in temperature, pressure, and low oxygen availability. Genomic analyses have identified genes that are involved in the energy metabolism, heat tolerance, and stress response. This supports the classification of A. profundus as a thermophilic extremophile.

== Ecology and Habitat ==
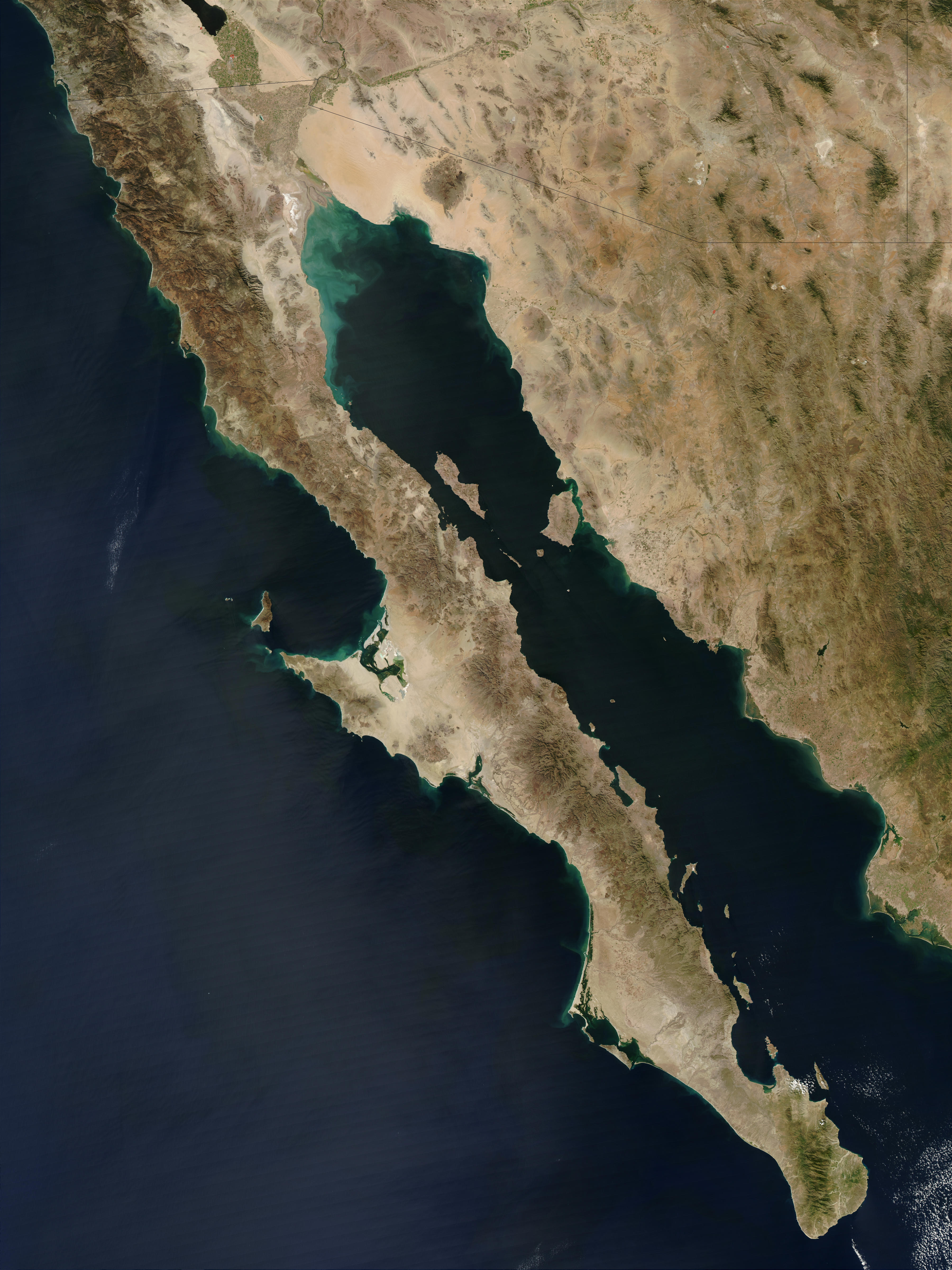
The Gulf of California, Mexico

A. profundus was first isolated from the walls of active hydrothermal smokers and from sediments at the deep-sea hydrothermal vent system in Guaymas Basin, Gulf of California, Mexico. The species has since been detected at other hydrothermal vent environments, including the Mid-Atlantic Ridge, the Juan de Fuca Ridge, and the Kairei hydrothermal vent field, as well as in deep North Sea oil reservoirs. Like all members of the genus Archaeoglobus, it is an obligate anaerobe and cannot survive in the presence of oxygen.

A. profundus is a hyperthermophile, with an optimal growth temperature of 82˚C, a pH optimum of 6.5, and a maximum growth temperature of 90˚C. The natural habitat of the species is characterised by steep geochemical and temperature gradients typical of hydrothermal vent chimney walls and hot marine sediments, where H₂ and sulfate are continuously supplied by hydrothermal fluid circulation. The organism has been shown to tolerate greater extremes of low pH, high sulfide concentration, and elevated temperature when actively metabolising than when deprived of carbon and energy source, suggesting that nutrient availability plays a key role in its environmental resilience. The Guaymas Basin in particular hosts an unusually rich archeal community, with A. profundus co-occurring alongside hyperthermophilic methanogens and other anaerobic sulfur-cycling lineages.

== Metabolism ==
A. profundus is an obligate mixotroph, requiring both molecular hydrogen (H₂) as an electron donor and an organic carbon source for growth. Sulfate, thiosulfate, and sulfite all serve as viable electron acceptors, with elemental sulfur notably inhibiting growth. The reduction of these sulfur compounds proceeds through dissimilatory sulfate reduction, yielding hydrogen sulfide as the terminal end product.

Energy conservation during this process is mediated by specialised enzymatic complexes. When grown on H₂ and sulfate, the organism produces two distinct heterodisulfide reductase-like enzymes: a membrane-bound complex (hmeCD), and a soluble six-subunit complex (Mvh:Hdl) containing nickel, iron-sulfur clusters, and FAD. The reducing equivalents generated by H₂ oxidation are channelled through these complexes to drive sulfate reduction.

While energy is harvested from sulfur reduction, carbon assimilation in A. profundus is strictly heterotrophic. Unlike the closely related A. lithotrophicus, which fixes CO₂ autotrophically via the Wood-Ljungdahl pathway, A. profundus lacks carbon monoxide dehydrogenase and therefore cannot fix carbon dioxide independently. Instead it requires acetate and CO₂ as obligate precursors for cellular biosynthesis.

== Genomics ==
The complete genome sequence of A. profundus type strain AV18T was published as part of the Genomic Encyclopedia of Bacteria and Archea (GEBA) project, making it the second member of the class Archaeoglobi to have its genome fully sequenced. The genome consists of a single circular chromosome of 1,563,423 base pairs, encoding 1,858 protein-coding genes and 52 RNA genes, and has a G+C content of approximately 40%. This makes the genome of A. profundus notably smaller than that of its close relative A. fulgidus, which spans approximately 2,178,400 base pairs.

In addition to its main chromosome, A. profundus harbors a small cryptic plasmid designated pGS5, measuring 2,802 base pairs and containing four genes whose apparent function is limited to maintaining the plasmid itself. Unusually, pGS5 is negatively supercoiled, in contrast to plasmids from other hyperthermophilic archaea which are typically found in a relaxed to positively supercoiled state, a distinction thought to reflect the activity of a DNA gyrase in A. profundus.

Genomic analysis has revealed several instances where the presence of certain genes implies metabolic or structural capabilities not observed under laboratory conditions, including genes associated with flagellation and chemotaxis. Comparative genomic studies across the genus Archaeoglobus provide evidence that its members are the closest known relatives of methanogenic archaea, supported by the identification of ten conserved signature proteins shared exclusively between Archaeoglobus and methanogens. The possibility that these shared proteins arose through lateral gene transfer rather than common ancestry has not been ruled out.

== Environmental and Industrial Significance ==
As a dissimilatory sulfate reducer, A. profundus plays a role in the biogeochemical sulfur cycle by converting sulfate to hydrogen sulfide in anaerobic high-temperature environments. Sulfate-reducing archaea of the genus Archaeoglobus are among the only archeal representatives capable of this form of anaerobic respiration, making them ecologically distinct contributors to sulfur cycling in deep-sea and subsurface habitats where bacterial sulfate reducers cannot survive.

A. profundus and its close relatives within the Archaeoglobales have been detected in deep subsurface oil reservoirs, where their sulfate-reducing activity contributes to a phenomenon known as reservoir souring. The production of hydrogen sulfide and iron sulfide by sulfate-reducing archaea causes corrosion of iron and steel infrastructure in oil and gas producing facilities, posing significant operational and economic challenges to the industry.

Despite these industrial challenges, Archaeoglobus species also present potential biotechnological applications. The biofilms produced by members of the genus under environmental stress conditions have been proposed as a means of removing heavy metals from contaminated water, and the organism's thermostable enzymes could be of interest for industrial processes that require catalytic activity at high temperatures.
