= Regulatory region of repBA gene =

Pseudoknot of the regulatory region of the repBA gene
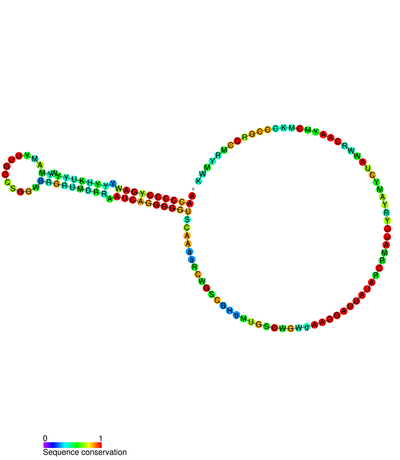
- Secondary structure of the pseudoknot of the regulatory region of the repBA gene

Identifiers
- Rfam: RF01089

Other data
- RNA type: Cis-reg
- Domain: Eukaryotes Prokaryotes
- PDB structures: PDBe

In plasmids, the regulatory region of repBA gene forms a pseudoknot. The repA gene, which encodes a protein likely to function as an initiator for replication, and the repB gene are translationally coupled. The leader sequence of the repA mRNA contains two complementary sequences of 8 bases. Base-pairing between these two sequences forms a pseudoknot which is essential for translation. The first of these complementary sequences is found within a stem-loop, which forms a target for RNAI. Binding of RNAI to this stem-loop inhibits pseudoknot formation and translation of RepA.
