= QMCF Technology =

Protein production system

QMCF Technology is an episomal protein production system that uses genetically modified mammalian cells and specially designed plasmids. QMCF plasmids carry a combination of regulatory sequences from mouse polyomavirus (Py) DNA replication origin which in combination with Epstein-Barr virus (EBV) EBNA-1 protein binding site as nuclear retention elements ensure stable propagation of plasmids in mammalian cells. In addition the vectors carry the selection marker operational for selection of plasmid carrying bacteria and QMCF cells, bacterial ColE1 origin of replication, and cassette for expression of protein of interest. QMCF cell lines express Large-T antigen and EBNA-1 proteins which bind the viral sequences on the QMCF plasmid and hence support plasmid replication and maintenance in the cells. QMCF Technology has several important differences compared to commonly known transient expression and stable cell line expression systems. Unlike in transient expression system, QMCF Technology enables to maintain episomally replicating QMCF plasmids inside the cells for up to 50 days thus providing an option for production phase of 2–3 weeks. Therefore, the production levels of QMCF Technology are higher (up to 1g/L). Another difference is the option of establishing expression cell banks within one week, which is not feasible with transient system. Compared to usage of stable cell line, QMCF technology is a rapid method leaving out time-consuming clone selection step during cell line development.

== Application ==
QMCF Technology can be used for the production of proteins, antibodies and virus-like particles for basic research and pharmaceutical development.

Protein production process starts with cloning cDNA of a target molecule into QMCF expression vector. Thereafter 1-6 μg of plasmid DNA is transfected by electroporation into QMCF cells (CHO or HEK293 based cells) for expression in serum-free suspension. Since QMCF plasmids contain antibiotic resistance gene and are able to stably replicate and remain inside dividing cells, a selection and growth of the cell culture takes place. This allows to upscale the production into desired volume. Finally, the process is switched to production phase by changing media temperature to 30 ̊C.

- construction of protein translocation assays for research and development for screening purposes
  - Adherent QMCF cell lines base on U2OS cells.
