= Choline-sulfatase =

Class of enzymes

Identifiers
- EC no.: 3.1.6.6
- CAS no.: 9025-59-6

Databases
- BRENDA: enzyme data
- ExPASy: NiceZyme view
- KEGG: enzyme entry
- MetaCyc: metabolic pathway
- Rhea: reactions
- PDB structures: RCSB PDB PDBe PDBsum
- Gene Ontology: AmiGO / QuickGO
Search
- PMC: articles
- PubMed: articles
- NCBI: proteins

The enzyme choline-sulfatase (EC 3.1.6.6) catalyzes the reaction

choline sulfate
H_{2}O
HSO^{−}_{4}
choline

The enzyme characterised from Pseudomonas nitroreducens and Sinorhizobium meliloti hydrolyses choline sulfate to choline and sulfate. A similar enzyme has been found in Vreelandella titanicae.

This enzyme is a hydrolase, specifically one acting on sulfuric ester bonds. The systematic name is choline-sulfate sulfohydrolase.
