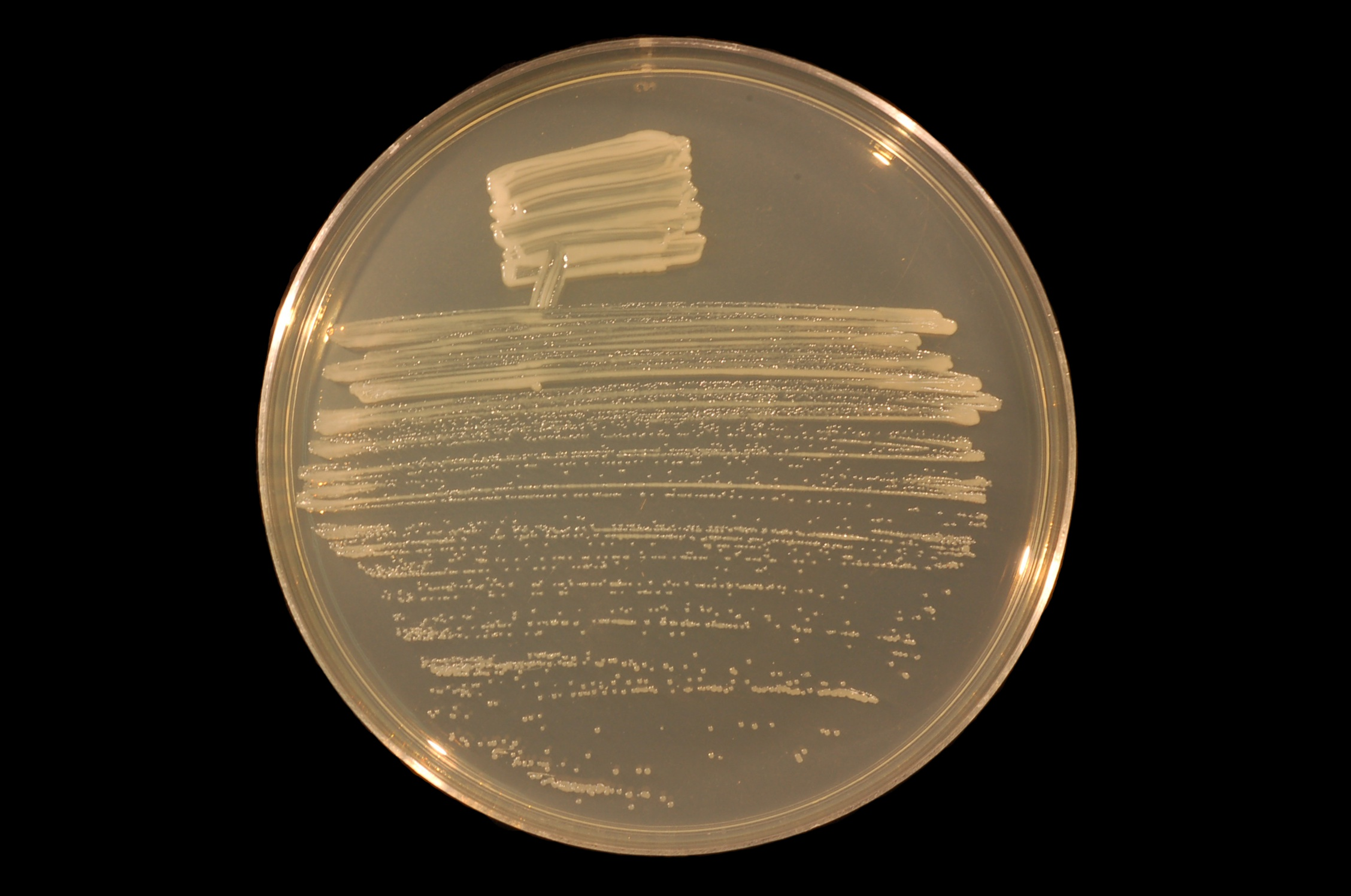
- Ensifer meliloti strain Rm1021 on an agar plate.

Scientific classification
- Domain: Bacteria
- Kingdom: Pseudomonadati
- Phylum: Pseudomonadota
- Class: Alphaproteobacteria
- Order: Hyphomicrobiales
- Family: Rhizobiaceae
- Genus: Ensifer
- Species: E. meliloti

Binomial name
- Ensifer meliloti (Dangeard, 1926) Young, 2003

Type strain
- ATCC 9930 CCUG 27879; CFBP 5561; CIP 107332; DSM 30135; HAMBI 2148; IAM 12611; ICMP 12623; IFO 14782; JCM 20682; LMG 6133; NBRC 14782; NCAIM B.01520; NCIMB 12075; NRRL L-45; NZP 4027; OUT 30010; USDA 1002

Biovars
- S. m. bv. acaciae; S. m. bv. ciceri; S. m. bv. lancerottense; S. m. bv. medicaginis; S. m. bv. mediterranense; S. m. bv. meliloti; S. m. bv. rigiduloides; S. m. ecotype NRR

Synonyms
- Rhizobium meliloti Dangeard, 1926; Sinorhizobium meliloti (Dangeard, 1926) De Lajudie et al., 1994

= Ensifer meliloti =

Species of bacterium

Ensifer meliloti (formerly Rhizobium meliloti and Sinorhizobium meliloti) are an aerobic, Gram-negative, and diazotrophic species of bacteria. E. meliloti are motile and possess a cluster of peritrichous flagella. E. meliloti fix atmospheric nitrogen into ammonia for their legume hosts, such as alfalfa. E. meliloti forms a symbiotic relationship with legumes from the genera Medicago, Melilotus and Trigonella, including the model legume Medicago truncatula. This symbiosis promotes the development of a plant organ, termed a root nodule. Because soil often contains a limited amount of nitrogen for plant use, the symbiotic relationship between E. meliloti and their legume hosts has agricultural applications. These techniques reduce the need for inorganic nitrogenous fertilizers.

== Symbiosis ==
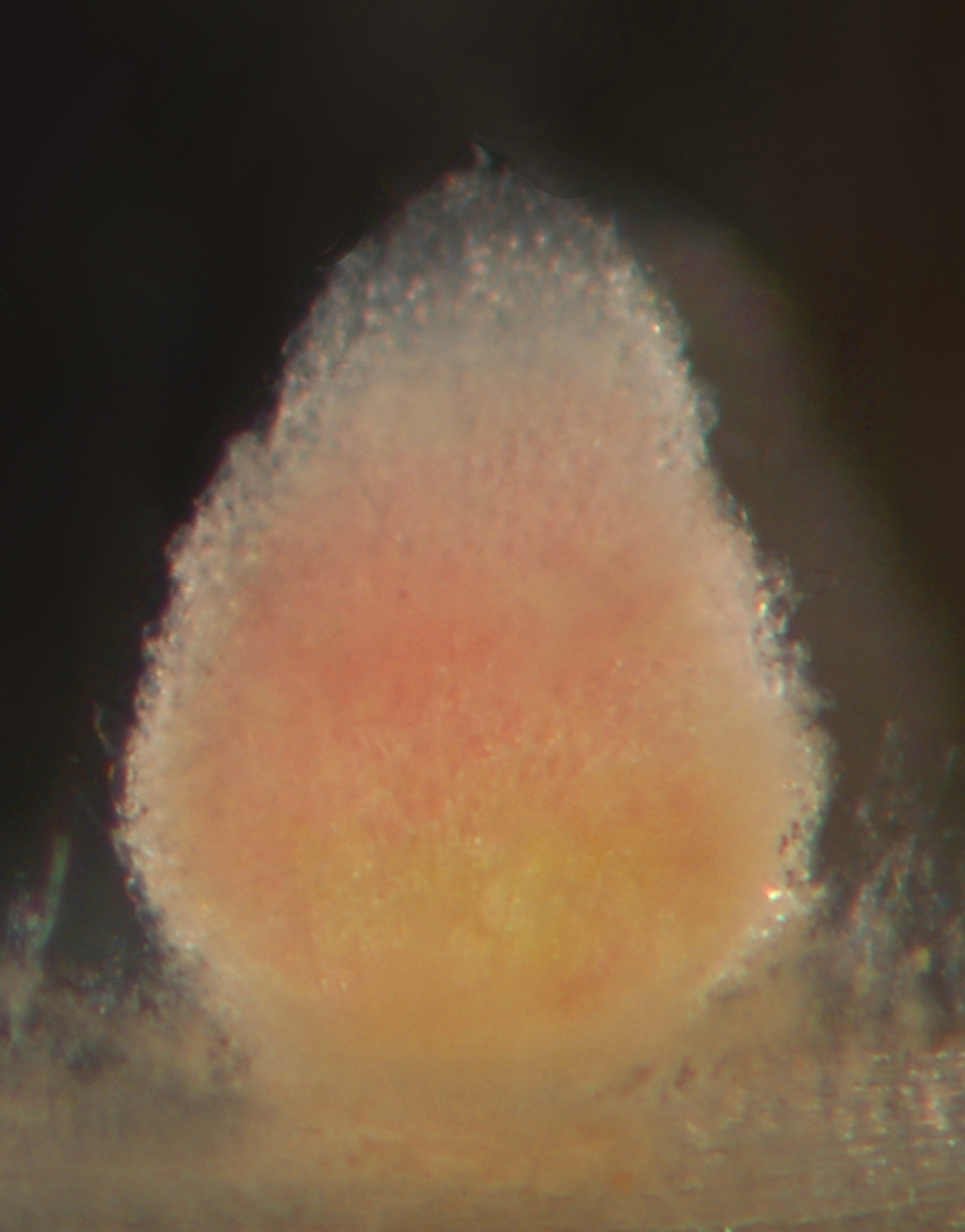
Indeterminate nodule

Prior to symbiosis, E. meliloti is a free-living member of the soil community. Symbiosis between E. meliloti and its legume hosts begins when the plant secretes an array of betaines and flavonoids into the rhizosphere: 4,4′-dihydroxy-2′-methoxychalcone, chrysoeriol, cynaroside, 4′,7-dihydroxyflavone, 6′′-O-malonylononin, liquiritigenin, luteolin, 3′,5-dimethoxyluteolin, 5-methoxyluteolin, medicarpin, stachydrine, and trigonelline. These compounds attract free-living E. meliloti within the surrounding soil to the surface of the root hairs of the host plant where the bacteria begin secreting nod factors. This initiates root hair curling. The rhizobia then penetrate the root hairs and proliferate to form an infection thread. Through the infection thread, the bacteria move toward the main root. The bacteria develop into bacteroids within newly formed root nodules and perform nitrogen fixation for the plant. A E. meliloti bacterium does not perform nitrogen fixation until it differentiates into a endosymbiotic bacteroid. A bacteroid depends on the plant for survival.

Leghemoglobin, produced by leguminous plants after colonization of E. meliloti, interacts with the free oxygen in the root nodule where the rhizobia reside. Rhizobia are contained within symbiosomes in the root nodules of leguminous plants. The leghemoglobin reduces the amount of free oxygen present. Oxygen disrupts the function of the nitrogenase enzyme in the rhizobia, which is responsible for nitrogen fixation.

== Genome ==
The E. meliloti genome contains four genes coding for flagellin. These include fliC1C2–fliC3C4. The genome contains three replicons: a chromosome (~3.7 megabases), a chromid (pSymB; ~1.7 megabases), and a megaplasmid (pSymA; ~1.4 megabases). Individual strains may possess additional, accessory plasmids. Over 500 E. meliloti genomes have been sequenced to date, including: Rm1021, AK83, BL225C, Rm41, and SM11 with Rm1021 considered to be the wild type. Indeterminate nodule symbiosis by E. meliloti is conferred by genes residing on pSymA.

=== DNA repair ===
The proteins encoded by E. meliloti genes uvrA, uvrB and uvrC are employed in the repair of DNA damages by the process of nucleotide excision repair. E. meliloti is a desiccation tolerant bacterium. However, E. meliloti mutants defective in either genes uvrA, uvrB or uvrC are sensitive to desiccation, as well as to UV light. This finding indicates that the desiccation tolerance of wild-type E. meliloti depends on the repair of DNA damages that can be caused by desiccation.

== Bacteriophage ==
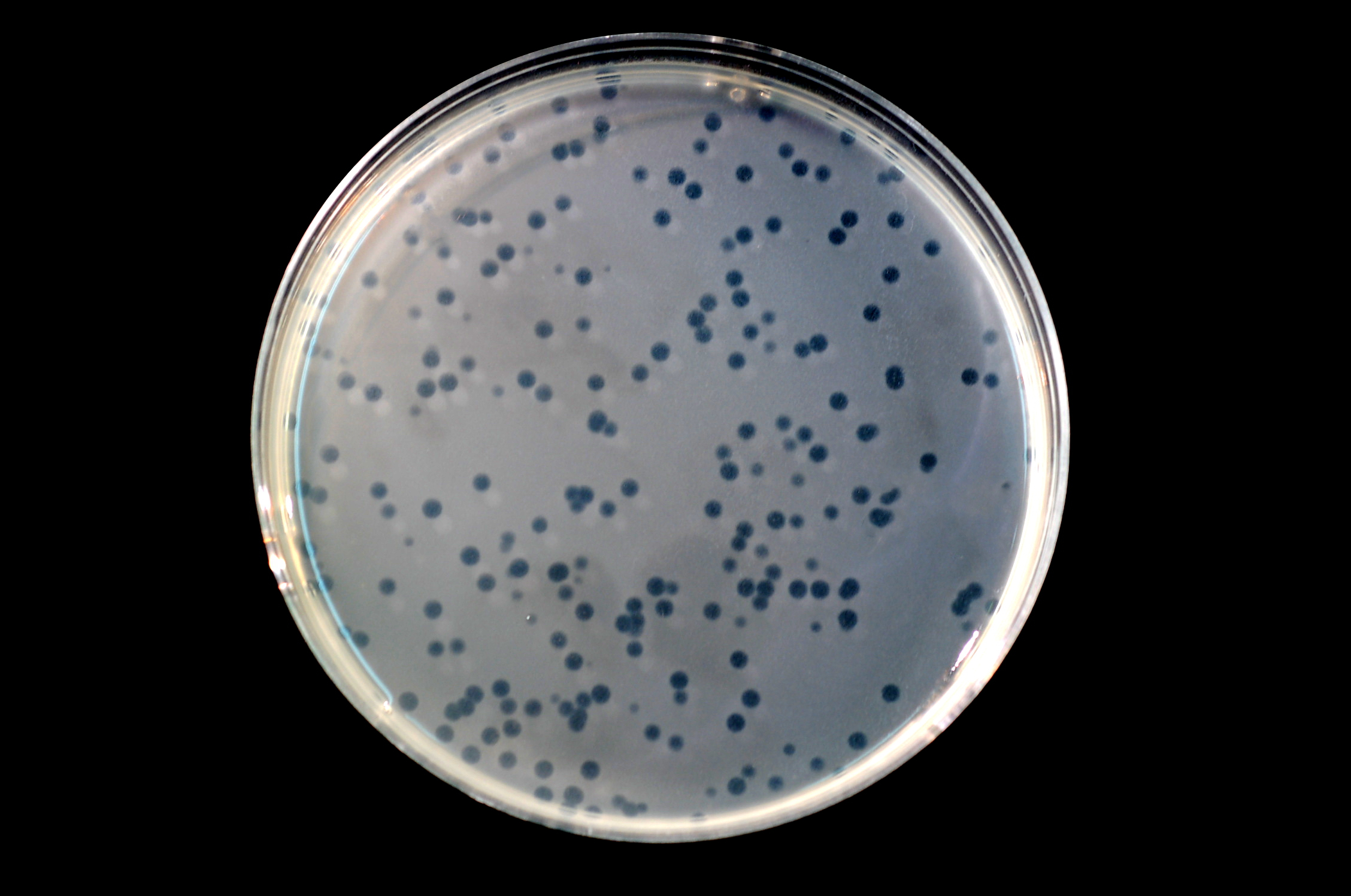
Plaques in E. meliloti caused by ΦM12.

Several bacteriophages that infect Ensifer meliloti have been described: Φ1, Φ1A, Φ2A, Φ3A, Φ4 (=ΦNM8), Φ5^{t} (=ΦNM3), Φ6 (=ΦNM4), Φ7 (=ΦNM9), Φ7a, Φ9 (=ΦCM2), Φ11 (=ΦCM9), Φ12 (=ΦCM6), Φ13, Φ16, Φ16-3, Φ16a, Φ16B, Φ27, Φ32, Φ36, Φ38, Φ43, Φ70, Φ72, Φ111, Φ143, Φ145, Φ147, Φ151, Φ152, Φ160, Φ161, Φ166, Φ2011, ΦA3, ΦA8, ΦA161, ΦAL1, ΦCM1, ΦCM3, ΦCM4, ΦCM5, ΦCM7, ΦCM8, ΦCM20, ΦCM21, ΦDF2, Φf2D, ΦF4, ΦFAR, ΦFM1, ΦK1, ΦL1, ΦL3, ΦL5, ΦL7, ΦL10, ΦL20, ΦL21, ΦL29, ΦL31, ΦL32, ΦL53, ΦL54, ΦL55, ΦL56, ΦL57, ΦL60, ΦL61, ΦL62, ΦLO0, ΦLS5B, ΦM1, ΦM1, ΦM1-5, ΦM2, ΦM3, ΦM4, ΦM5, ΦM5 (=ΦF20), ΦM5N1, ΦM6, ΦM7, ΦM8, ΦM9, ΦM10, ΦM11, ΦM11S, ΦM12, ΦM14, ΦM14S, ΦM19, ΦM20S, ΦM23S, ΦM26S, ΦM27S, ΦMl, ΦMM1C, ΦMM1H, ΦMP1, ΦMP2, ΦMP3, ΦMP4, ΦN2, ΦN3, ΦN4, ΦN9, ΦNM1, ΦNM2, ΦNM6, ΦNM7, ΦP6, ΦP10, ΦP33, ΦP45, ΦPBC5, ΦRm108, ΦRmp26, ΦRmp36, ΦRmp38, ΦRmp46, ΦRmp50, ΦRmp52, ΦRmp61, ΦRmp64, ΦRmp67, ΦRmp79, ΦRmp80, ΦRmp85, ΦRmp86, ΦRmp88, ΦRmp90, ΦRmp145, ΦSP, ΦSSSS304, ΦSSSS305, ΦSSSS307, ΦSSSS308, and ΦT1. Of these, ΦM5, ΦM12, Φ16-3 and ΦPBC5 have been sequenced.

As of March 2020 the International Committee on Taxonomy of Viruses (ICTV) has accepted the following species in its Master Species List 2019.v1 (#35):

- Realm: Duplodnaviria, Kingdom: Heunggongvirae, Phylum: Uroviricota

- Order: Caudovirales, Family: Myoviridae, Genus: Emdodecavirus (formerly M12virus)

- Species: Sinorhizobium virus M7 (alias ΦM7)
- Species: Sinorhizobium virus M12 (alias DNA phage ΦM12, type species)
- Species: Sinorhizobium virus N3 (alias ΦN3)
