= Archaeoglobus =

Scientific classification
- Domain: Archaea
- Kingdom: Methanobacteriati
- Phylum: Methanobacteriota
- Class: Archaeoglobi
- Order: Archaeoglobales
- Family: Archaeoglobaceae
- Genus: Archaeoglobus; Stetter 1988

Type species
- Archaeoglobus fulgidus Stetter 1988

Species
- A. fulgidus; "A. lithotrophicus"; A. infectus; A. neptunius; A. profundus; A. veneficus; A. sulfaticallidus

Genus of archaea

Archaeoglobus is a genus of archaeans in the phylum Euryarchaeota. Archaeoglobus can be found in high-temperature oil fields where they may contribute to oil field souring.

== Metabolism ==
Archaeoglobus grow anaerobically at extremely high temperatures between 60 and 95 °C, with optimal growth at 83 °C (ssp. A. fulgidus VC-16). They are sulfate-reducing archaea, coupling the reduction of sulfate to sulfide with the oxidation of many different organic carbon sources, including complex polymers.

A. lithotrophicus live chemolitho-autotrophically from hydrogen, sulfate and carbon dioxide. Also A. profundus grow lithotrophically, but while this species needs acetate and CO_{2} for biosynthesis they are heterotroph.

The complete A. fulgidus genome sequence revealed the presence of a nearly complete set of genes for methanogenesis. The function of these genes in A. fulgidus remains unknown, while the lack of the enzyme methyl-CoM reductase does not allow for methanogenesis to occur by a mechanism similar to that found in other methanogens.

== Description and significance ==
Archaeoglobus members are hyperthermophiles that can be found in hydrothermal vents, oil deposits, and hot springs. They can produce biofilm when subjected to environmental stresses such as extreme pH or temperature, high concentrations of metal, or the addition of antibiotics, xenobiotics, or oxygen. These archaeons are known to cause the corrosion of iron and steel in oil and gas processing systems by producing iron sulphide. Their biofilms, however, may have industrial or research applications in the form of detoxifying metal contaminated samples or to gather metals in an economically recoverable form.

== Genome structure ==
The Archaeoglobus fulgidus genome is a circular chromosome roughly half the size of E. coli at 2,178,000 base pairs. A quarter of the genome encodes preserved proteins whose functions are not yet determined, but are expressed in other archaeons such as Methanococcus jannaschii. Another quarter encodes proteins unique to the archaeal domain. One observation about the genome is that there are many gene duplications and the duplicated proteins are not identical. This suggests metabolic differentiation specifically with respect to the decomposing and recycling carbon pathways through scavenged fatty acids. The duplicated genes also gives the genome a larger genome size than its fellow archaeon M. jannaschii. It is also noted that Archaeoglobus contained no inteins in coding regions where M. jannaschii had 18.

== Molecular signatures showing relatedness to methanogens and Thermococci ==
Comparative genomic studies on archaeal genomes provide evidence that members of the genus Archaeoglobus are the closest relatives of methanogenic archaea. This is supported by the presence of 10 conserved signature proteins that are uniquely found in all methanogens and Archaeoglobus. Additionally, 18 proteins which are uniquely found in members of Thermococci, Archaeoglobus and methanogens have been identified, suggesting that these three groups of Archaea may have shared a common relative exclusive of other Archaea. However, the possibility that the shared presence of these signature proteins in these archaeal lineages is due to lateral gene transfer cannot be excluded.

== Ecology ==
Archaeoglobus species utilize their environment by acting as scavengers with many potential carbon sources. They can obtain carbon from fatty acids, the degradation of amino acids, aldehydes, organic acids, and possibly CO as well. Higher temperatures (approx. 83 °C) are ideal growth temperatures for Archaeoglobus, although a biofilm environment provides some environmental elasticity. Biofilm is composed of polysaccharides, proteins, and metals.

== Medicine ==
Cells protected by biofilm are difficult to destroy using conventional anti-microbial therapy, which gives them medicinal possibilities.

== Phylogeny ==
The currently accepted taxonomy is based on the List of Prokaryotic names with Standing in Nomenclature (LPSN) and National Center for Biotechnology Information (NCBI).

16S rRNA based LTP_07_2026

- - Geoglobus
  - - - Archaeoglobus
        - A. fulgidus Stetter 1988 (type sp.)
        - A. neptunius Slobodkina et al. 2021
    - - - Ferroglobus
        - - Archaeoglobus~1
            Archaeoglobus profundus Burggraf et al. 1990
      - - Archaeoglobus~2
          - Archaeoglobus veneficus Huber et al. 1998
          - - Archaeoglobus infectus Mori et al. 2008
            - Archaeoglobus sulfaticallidus Steinsbu et al. 2010

53 marker proteins based GTDB 11-RS232

- - - Archaeoglobus_C
      Archaeoglobus veneficus
    - Archaeoglobus_A
      Archaeoglobus sulfaticallidus
  - - - Archaeoglobus_B
        Archaeoglobus profundus
    - - - Ferroglobus
        - Geoglobus
      - - Archaeoglobus
          - A. fulgidus
          - A. neptunius

== See also ==
- List of Archaea genera
