= Univec =

Biological database

UniVec

Content
- Description: vector contamination

Contact
- Primary citation: Cochrane & al. (2010)

Access
- Website: https://www.ncbi.nlm.nih.gov/tools/vecscreen/univec/
- Download URL: ftp

UniVec is a database that can be used to remove vector contamination from DNA sequences.

== See also ==
- Plasmid
- VectorDB
