= Secondary chromosome =

Are a class of bacterial replicons (replicating DNA molecules)

Chromids, formerly (and less specifically) secondary chromosomes, (Note: Some secondary chromosomes are not chromids. For example, the secondary chromosome of Brucella melitensis carries no plasmid-like replication systems and instead use the standard DnaA/oriC, even though its relatives in Ochrobactrum use a RepABC system. The chromid mode of replicon generation is also only seen in bacteria (as of 2023) and archaeal "secondary chromosomes" replicate like normal chromosomes.) are a class of bacterial replicons (replicating DNA molecules). These replicons are called "chromids" because they have characteristic features of both chromosomes and plasmids. Early on, it was thought that all core genes could be found on the main chromosome of the bacteria. However, in 1989 a replicon (now known as a chromid) was discovered containing core genes outside of the main chromosome. These core genes make the chromid indispensable to the organism. Chromids are large replicons, although not as large as the main chromosome. However, chromids are almost always larger than a plasmid (or megaplasmid). Chromids also share many genomic signatures of the chromosome, including their GC-content and their codon usage bias. On the other hand, chromids do not share the replication systems of chromosomes. Instead, they use the replication system of plasmids. Chromids are present in 10% of bacteria species sequenced by 2009.

Bacterial genomes divided between a main chromosome and one or more chromids (and / or megaplasmids) are said to be divided or multipartite genomes. The vast majority of chromid-encoding bacteria only have a single chromid, although 9% have more than one (compared with 12% of megaplasmid-encoding bacteria containing multiple megaplasmids). The genus Azospirillum contains three species which have up to five chromids, the most chromids known in a single species to date. Chromids also appear to be more common in bacteria which have a symbiotic or pathogenic relationship with eukaryotes and with organisms with high tolerance to abiotic stressors.

Chromids were discovered in 1989, in a species of Alphaproteobacteria known as Rhodobacter sphaeroides. However, the formalization of the concept of a "chromid" as an independent type of replicon only came about in 2010. Several classifications further distinguish between chromids depending on conditions of their essentiality, their replication system, and more.

The two hypotheses for the origins of chromids are the "plasmid" and "schism" hypotheses. According to the plasmid hypothesis, chromids originate from plasmids which have acquired core genes over evolutionary time and so stabilized in their respective lineages. According to the schism hypothesis, chromids as well as the main chromosome originate from a schism of a larger, earlier chromosome. The plasmid hypothesis is presently widely accepted, although there may be rare cases where large replicons originate from a chromosomal schism. One finding holds that chromids originated 45 times across bacterial phylogenies and were lost twice.

== Discovery and classification ==
=== Discovery ===
Early in the era of bacterial genomics, the genomes of bacteria were thought to have a relatively simple architecture. All known bacteria had circular chromosomes containing all the crucial genes. Some bacteria had additional replicons known as plasmids, and plasmids were characteristically small, circular, and dispensable (meaning that they only encoded non-essential genes). As more bacteria and their genomes were studied, many alternative forms of bacterial genomic architecture began to be discovered. Linear chromosomes and linear plasmids were discovered in a number of species. Soon after, bacteria with several large replicons were discovered, leading to the view that bacteria, just like eukaryotes, can have a genome made up of more than one chromosome. The first example of this was Rhodobacter sphaeroides in 1989, but additional discoveries quickly followed with Brucella melitensis in 1993, Burkholderia cepacia complex in 1994, Rhizobium meliloti in 1995, Bacillus thuringiensis in 1996, and now about 10% of bacterial species are known to have large replicons that are separate from the main chromosome.

=== Definition ===
With the onset of these discoveries, several approaches in classifying different components of multipartite genomes were proposed. Various terms have been used to describe large replicons other than the main chromosome, including simply designating them as additional chromosomes, or "minichromosomes", "megaplasmids", or "secondary chromosomes". Criteria used to distinguish between these replicons typically revolve around features such as size and the presence of core genes. In 2010, the classification of these genomic elements as chromids was proposed. Previous terms, such as "secondary chromosome", are considered inadequate upon the observation that these replicons contain the replication systems of plasmids and so are a fundamentally different class of replicons than chromosomes. The original definition of a 'chromid' involves meeting three criteria:

1. chromids have plasmid-type maintenance and replication systems;
2. chromids have a nucleotide composition close to that of the chromosome;
3. chromids carry core genes that are found on the chromosome in other species.

While this definition is robust, the authors who proposed it did so with the expectation that some exceptions would be found that would blur the lines between chromids and other replicons. This expectation existed because of the general tendency for evolutionary lineages to produce ambiguous systems, which has resulted in the more well-known issues in formulating a widely encompassing species definition.

Since the classification of chromids, other replicons have been discovered which share some features of chromids but have been categorized separately. One example is the designated "rrn-plasmid" found in a clade within the bacterial genus Aureimonas. The rrn-plasmid contains the rrn (rRNA) operon (hence its name), and the rrn operon cannot be found on the main chromosome. The main chromosome is therefore termed as an "rrn-lacking chromosome" or RLC, and so the clade of bacteria within Aureimonas which possess the rrn-plasmid is also termed the "RLC clade". Members of the RLC clade have nine replicons, of which the main chromosome is the largest and the rrn-plasmid is the smallest at only 9.4kb. The rrn-plasmid also has a high copy number in RLC bacteria. While this very small size and copy number resembles plasmids more than it does chromids, the rrn-plasmid still ahs the only copies of the genes in the rrn operon and for tRNA(Ile). This distinctive collection of features led the scientists discovering this replicon to simply classify it as an rrn-plasmid, which is thought of as a separate classification than a "plasmid" or "chromid".

=== Additional proposed classifications ===
Beyond classifying certain replicons as chromids, a number of scientists have proposed further distinguishing between different types of chromids. One classification distinguishes between primary and secondary chromids. Primary chromids are defined as chromids containing core genes that are always essential for the survival of the bacterium under all conditions. Secondary chromids are defined as chromids essential for survival in the native conditions of the bacterium, but may be non-essential in certain "safe" conditions such as a laboratory environment. Secondary chromids may also have more recent evolutionary origins and may retain some more plasmid-like features as compared with primary chromids. An example of a proposed primary chromid is "chromosome II" of Paracoccus denitrificans PD1222.

== Characteristics ==
=== Size and copy number ===
In a bacterial genome, the main chromosome will always be the largest replicon, followed by the chromid and then the plasmid. One exception to this trend is known in Deinococcus deserti VCD115, where both plasmids are larger than the chromid.

Chromids vary considerably in size between organisms. In the bacterial genus Vibrio, the main chromosome varies between 3.0 and 3.3 Mb whereas the chromid varies between 0.8 and 2.4 Mb in size. A replicon in a strain of Buchnera, which encodes some core genes, is only 7.8kb. While the presence of core genes may lead to the classification of this replicon as a chromid, this replicon may also be excluded on certain definitions. Some approaches only categorize certain replicons as chromids if they meet a threshold size of 350kb. It has also been observed that chromids tend to have a low copy number in the cell, as with chromosomes and megaplasmids. On average, chromids are twice as large as megaplasmids (and so the emergence of a chromid from a megaplasmid is associated with a sizable gene accumulation in the aftermath of the conversion). One of the largest chromids is the one in Burkholderia pseudomallei, which exceeds 3.1 million nucleotides in size, i.e. 3.1 megabases or 3.1 Mb.

=== Genomic features ===
Chromids more frequently have a lower G + C content compared with the main chromosome, although the strength of this association is not very strong. A chromid will also typically have a G + C content within 1% of that of the main chromosome, reflecting its nearing the base composition equilibrium of the main chromosome after having stably existed within a bacterial lineage for a necessary period of time. Chromids also resemble the main chromosome in their codon usage bias. One analysis found that chromids had a median 0.34% difference in GC content with the main chromosome, compared with values of 1.9% for megaplasmids and 2.8% for plasmids.

Chromids have at least one core gene absent from the main chromosome. (Main chromosomes contain the bulk of the core genes of a bacterium, whereas plasmids contain no core genes.) For example, the chromid in Vibrio cholerae contains genes for the ribosomal subunits L20 and L35. While most chromids have a disproportionately smaller number of essential genes compared to the main chromosome, such as rRNA genes or the genes in the rRNA operon, some may have many more essential genes and may even be considered "equal partners" with the chromosome. In general, chromids also see an enrichment of genes involved in the processes of transport, metabolism, transcription, regulatory functions, signal transduction, and motility-related functions. Proteins located on chromids are involved in processes which can interact with proteins encoded on the main chromosome. Chromids also have more transposase genes than chromosomes, but less than megaplasmids.

=== Phylogenetic distribution ===
The presence of core genes makes the chromid essential to the survival of the bacterium. The same core genes will be found on the chromids within a genus but not necessarily between genera. All chromids of a genus may additionally share a large number of conserved but non-essential genes which help define the phenotype of the genus (and the emergence of chromids appears to be the primary evolutionary force in the formation of chromid-encoding bacterial genera, as has been suggested in the case of Vibrio). In contrast, bacterial chromosomes may universally or near-universally share hundreds of conserved core genes. Plasmids contain no core genes, and unlike chromids, plasmids of different species within a bacterial genus (or even just different isolates within the same species) share few genes. This is partly due to the common transfer of gain and loss of plasmids and their transfer between bacteria through conjugation (a form of horizontal gene transfer), while chromids are passed on through cell divisions (vertically) with no evidence of chromids moving through horizontal gene transfer. It has been observed that the chromid in at least one bacterial species could be eliminated without making the bacterium inviable, however, the bacterium did become auxotrophic indicating a severe fitness compromise associated with the loss of the chromid.

Due to their stable presence within a bacterial genus, chromids also have a feature of being phylogenetically restricted to specific genera. Examples of genera of bacteria with chromids include Deinococcus, Leptospira, Cyanothece (a type of cyanobacteria), and an enrichment of genera of the Pseudomonadota. Overall, bacterial genome sequencing indicates that roughly 10% of bacterial species have a chromid. It has also been found that there is a bias towards co-occurrence of a chromid and a megaplasmid in the same organism. Chromids also appear more frequently in phylogenies than do megaplasmids (in approximately twice as many species), despite megaplasmids being the putative evolutionary source for chromids. This may result in the tendency of organisms to lose their megaplasmids over time, compared with the inherently greater evolutionary stability of chromids.

=== Replication ===
Chromids share features of the replication of both chromosomes and plasmids. For one, chromids use the replication system of plasmids. While plasmids do not replicate in coordination with the main chromosome or the cell cycle, chromids do and only replicate once per cell cycle. In the bacterial genus Vibrio, replication of the main chromosome begins before replication of the chromid. The chromid is smaller than the chromosome, and so takes a shorter amount of time to finish replication. For this reason, replication of the chromid is delayed to coordinate replication termination between the chromosome and chromid. Earlier replication of the chromosome compared with the chromid has also been observed in Ensifer meliloti. Bacteria also rely on different replication factors to start replication between the chromosome and the chromid. Replication of the chromosome is initiated upon stimulation of the expression of the protein DnaA, whereas expression of chromid replication requires DnaA but also depends on RctB. This is similar to F1 and P plasmids which also depend on DnaA but still have their replication controlled by other proteins (specifically RepA and RepE). Segregation of the chromid follows different patterns between different genera of bacteria, although it typically takes place after the segregation of the main chromosome.

So far, chromids are known to replicate with one of two types of systems: either with the repABC system or with iterons.

=== Evolutionary flexibility ===
Several studies indicate that chromids are less conserved and evolve more rapidly than do chromosomes in bacteria. In a study of many species of the genus Vibrio, it was found that the main, large chromosome had a consistent size range of 3–3.3 Mb, whereas the secondary chromosome flexibly ranged from 0.8 to 2.4 Mb. This considerable variation indicates a greater degree of structural flexibility. Bacteria of the genus Agrobacterium and another genera can have three or more chromids, and these multiple chromids in several strains commonly undergo large-scale rearrangements which can involve the translocation of one sizable portion of one chromid into another. Genes located on chromids are also more prone to evolve and display less purifying selection. Since common species definition for prokaryotes are based on DNA sequence or average nucleotide identity, the greater evolvability of the chromid may result in organisms with chromids having a greater tendency to speciate.

== Origins ==
=== "Schism" and "plasmid" hypotheses ===
Several suggestions have been put forwards to explain the origins of chromids. The two main hypotheses are the "schism hypothesis" and the "plasmid hypothesis". According to the schism hypothesis, two separate bacterial chromosomes may arise through the splitting of one larger chromosome, resulting in a main and a secondary chromosome (or a chromid). However, due to the plasmid-type maintenance and replication systems in chromids as well as the uneven distribution of core genes between the main chromosome and the chromid, the plasmid hypothesis suggesting that chromids evolved from megaplasmids which acquired core genes is widely accepted. Once megaplasmids acquire core genes from the main chromosome, combined with the simultaneous loss of those core genes from the main chromosome, the plasmid becomes a stable and required element of the bacterial genome. (Megaplasmids may also acquire duplicate copies of core genes from the main chromosome. The existence of the duplicate core gene may degenerate on the main chromosome, leading to its sole presence on the newly formed chromid. In this case, the chromid is formed through a neutral transition.) This event also stabilizes the other genes located on the new chromid, which may result in a characteristic phenotype for the new lineage. These core genes can transfer to a megaplasmid through several means. One is homologous recombination between the main chromosome and the plasmid. It is also possible that an existing chromid could recombine with a plasmid to gain its replication system. Once a chromid appears in a lineage, it is stable over long evolutionary periods. Several bacteria genera have chromids which are characteristic to each genus. Whereas the chromids found in a single genus may universally share a large number of genes, there are no genes universally found across the chromids of different genera.

Plasmids are almost always if not always the source for the origins of chromids, but at least two bacterial strains may have their large replicons derive from the schism of a larger chromosome. In these exceptional cases, the term "secondary chromosome" may be retained to describe them and so, in this sense, differentiate them from "chromids". Identifying a replicon as a "secondary chromosome" may be done on the basis of conserved synteny and random distribution of core genes with the main chromosome.

=== Proposed adaptive causes ===
The question of the origins of chromids is tied to the question of why they evolved. One possibility is that chromids are a "frozen accident", where they simply happened to evolve by chance and for no particular reason and so, for this reason alone, are present in the lineage descendant from the organism in which they emerged. In this scenario, core genes end up on the chromid by chance, but the chance fixation of core genes on the secondary replicon through neutral transitions leads to its essentiality to the organism. However, chromids may also bring some advantages which helps the bacterium compete in its environment. It has been observed that bacteria with chromids are capable of growing faster in culture, and also contain fairly more sizable genomes. Chromid-encoding bacteria have a genome with an average size of 5.73 ± 1.66 Mb, whereas bacteria which do not encode chromids have an average genome size of 3.38 ± 1.81 Mb. For this reason, some have concluded that the placement of a number of genes on the chromid instead of the main chromosome allows for genome expansion without compromising replication speed and efficiency. On the other hand, two thirds of bacterial genomes over 6 Mb are not multipartite and only three of the fifty largest genomes are multipartite, and so a larger genome has not yet been causally demonstrated as a reason for the evolutionary origins of a chromid. Chromids can also be frequently found on fast-growing bacteria, suggesting their contribution to replication and division speed, although here too several analyses have raised difficulties with this suggestion as a driving evolutionary force for the emergence of chromids. Instead, it is more likely that genome expansion and faster replication speed may be involved in the maintenance of chromids in lineages but not a causal explanation for their emergence. Chromids may also allow for coordinated expression of niche-specific genes. Random though rare emergence of chromids which happen to have the necessary genes to confer an advantageous lifestyle in a given environment may play an important role in stabilizing that chromid in the organism and leading to a new lineage defined by the presence of the now crucial replicon.
