= Rop protein =

Regulatory protein rop

Identifiers
- Organism: Escherichia coli
- Symbol: Rop
- UniProt: P03051
Search for
- Structures: Swiss-model
- Domains: InterPro

Rop (also known as repressor of primer, or as RNA one modulator (ROM)) is a small dimeric protein responsible for keeping the copy number of ColE1 family and related bacterial plasmids low in E. coli by increasing the speed of pairing between the preprimer RNA, RNA II, and its antisense RNA, RNA I. Structurally, Rop is a homodimeric four-helix bundle protein formed by the antiparallel interaction of two helix-turn-helix monomers. The Rop protein's structure has been solved to high resolution. Due to its small size and known structure, Rop has been used in protein design work to rearrange its helical topology and reengineer its loop regions. In general, the four-helix bundle has been extensively used in de novo protein design work as a simple model to understand the relationship between amino acid sequence and structure.

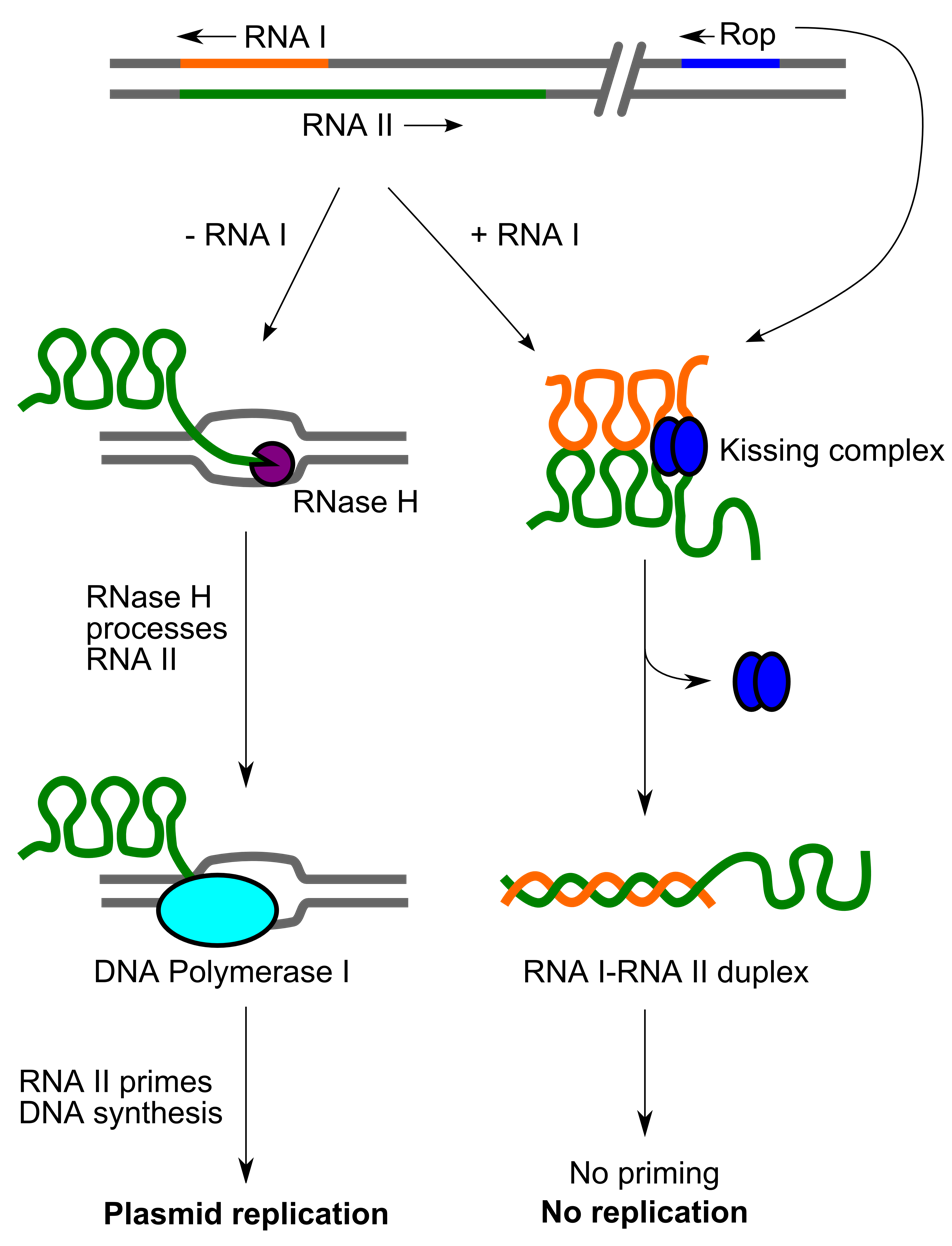
ColE1 replication control
