= Alan Grossman =

American microbiologist

- Education: Brown University; UW–Madison
- Awards: Eli Lilly and Company-Elanco Research Award (1997)
- Scientific career
- Workplaces: Massachusetts Institute of Technology

Alan Davis Grossman, is an American microbiologist; he is currently the Praecis Professor of Biology and served head of the Department of Biology at the Massachusetts Institute of Technology from 2014-2022. He is a member of the National Academy of Sciences and the American Academy of Arts & Sciences.

== Education ==
Grossman received a Bachelor of Arts in biochemistry from Brown University in 1979. He earned his Ph.D. at the University of Wisconsin–Madison in 1984. Grossman completed a postdoctoral fellowship in the Department of Cellular and Developmental Biology at Harvard University before joining MIT's biology department in 1988.

== Career ==
Initially, his research was focused on characterization of bacterial chromosome segregation. His group was among the first that identified the Spo0J protein, the homologue of ParB, responsible for the process of chromosome segregation in B. subtilis. He later moved on to show that Spo0J binds to specific cis-sites on the DNA in order to implement its function and identified the sequences of those cis-sites which was termed ParS.

In 2006, Grossman received a life-saving heart transplant. He has discussed the experience publicly and encouraged others to consider organ donation.
