= Alkaline lysis =

Process of isolating plasmid DNA from cells

Alkaline lysis is the process of isolating and extracting deoxyribonucleic acid (DNA) from plasmids and other extrachromosomal sources present in cells such as bacterial cells. It is a standard method used in molecular biology to isolate plasmid DNA without obtaining chromosomal or genomic DNA. The first alkaline lysis was performed by Birnom and Doly in 1979. There are many variations of the procedure but the general process of alkaline lysis can be summarized with the following steps: formation of a cell pellet, resuspension of the pellet in solution, cell lysis, neutralization, and centrifugation. Alkaline lysis takes advantage of the small and supercoiled physical composition of plasmid DNA compared to chromosomal DNA, along with its ability to re-anneal double-stranded DNA in optimal conditions. This allows for the separation of plasmid DNA from chromosomal DNA and other cellular components.

== Method ==
Alkaline lysis is often an initial step in molecular biology experiments, allowing specific DNA molecules to be extracted and purified so that it can subsequently be used in downstream applications. When performed properly, alkaline lysis yields pure DNA exclusively from bacterial plasmids. A plasmid is a small circular DNA molecule that is found naturally in certain cell types, most commonly bacterial cells, and replicates independently of the cell's chromosomal or genomic DNA. Plasmids can also be found less commonly in archaeal and eukaryotic cells. They often contain genetic information useful to the host cell, such as genes that confer antibiotic resistance or virulence factors. Plasmids are readily uptaken by bacterial cells from the environment and can be passed between cells by various forms of horizontal transmission such as transduction, transformation, and conjugation, as well as by vertical transmission from parent to offspring. Because of their versatility and relatively simple manipulation, plasmids are of interest to scientists and have become a standardized laboratory tool by which recombinant DNA is artificially introduced into cells and genomes.

The basic process of alkaline lysis involves a series of steps which can be performed in the laboratory:

=== Step 1: Formation of cell pellet ===
First, a sample containing bacterial cells, often grown in cell culture, is centrifuged to form a pellet of cells at the bottom of the sample tube. Centrifugation allows for separation of the bacterial cells from the growth medium and any other excess debris that may be present in the sample. The supernatant growth medium is discarded, leaving only the cell pellet at the bottom of the tube.

=== Step 2: Resuspension ===
The pellet is then resuspended in a buffer solution containing EDTA, Tris-HCl, glucose, and ribonucleases. Ethylenediaminetetraacetic acid (EDTA) is a chelating agent that binds metal ions, primarily divalent or trivalent ions. In this step, EDTA is added to bind up calcium and magnesium ions, which are naturally found in cells and are used by DNase enzymes to cleave double-stranded DNA; sequestering them with EDTA thus prevents DNases from degrading the plasmid DNA. Tris hydrochloride is a widely used buffer solution which stabilizes the pH and thereby protects the integrity of the DNA. Tris-HCl is necessary due to the high-pH (alkaline) environment that must temporarily be established in order to lyse open the cells and release their contents. Glucose is an osmolyte, a molecule that helps regulate osmotic stress; it is added to prevent cells from lysing uncontrollably and thus damaging the DNA. RNases are enzymes that degrade RNA molecules, preventing contamination of the plasmid DNA with any RNA molecules that may be present in the cells.

=== Step 3: Cell lysis ===
Sodium dodecyl sulfate (SDS) and sodium hydroxide (NaOH) are then used to lyse the cells. Sodium hydroxide is a strong base which dramatically increases the pH of the solution, establishing an alkaline environment that disrupts the phospholipid bilayers that comprise cell membranes and breaks hydrogen bonds between the paired strands of double-stranded chromosomal DNA, making it single-stranded. Though the plasmid DNA is also double-stranded and also dissociates into single strands, its highly supercoiled nature prevents the individual strands from being separated in the solution, allowing them to re-anneal later. Sodium dodecyl sulfate is an anionic surfactant that inserts itself into the phospholipid bilayer, disrupting the hydrophobic interactions that make up the cell membranes. Sodium hydroxide and SDS detergent thus work together to lyse the host cells and release their internal contents, including both chromosomal and plasmid DNA molecules, into the solution.

=== Step 4: Neutralization ===
A property of DNA is its ability to re-anneal into double-stranded molecules when pH conditions are neutralized. Under neutral conditions, hydrogen bonds reform between complementary base pairs. Because the plasmid was so tightly coiled and small before the alkaline conditions were established, it can easily re-anneal. The chromosomal DNA, however, because of its lengthy strands, does not re-anneal.

=== Step 5: Centrifugation ===
Once the plasmid DNA reassociates into double-stranded molecules, it dissolves into the solution. Potassium acetate reacts with the SDS detergent, magnesium ions, and calcium ions already present in the solution and forms potassium dodecyl sulfate (KDS), an insoluble white solid which precipitates out of solution. The remaining chromosomal DNA strands, denatured proteins, and added chemicals stick together and precipitate out with the KDS. The plasmid DNA, however, remains dissolved in the liquid solution. The solution is usually centrifuged to collect the insoluble precipitates into a debris pellet at the bottom of the sample tube and thereby isolate them from the supernatant.

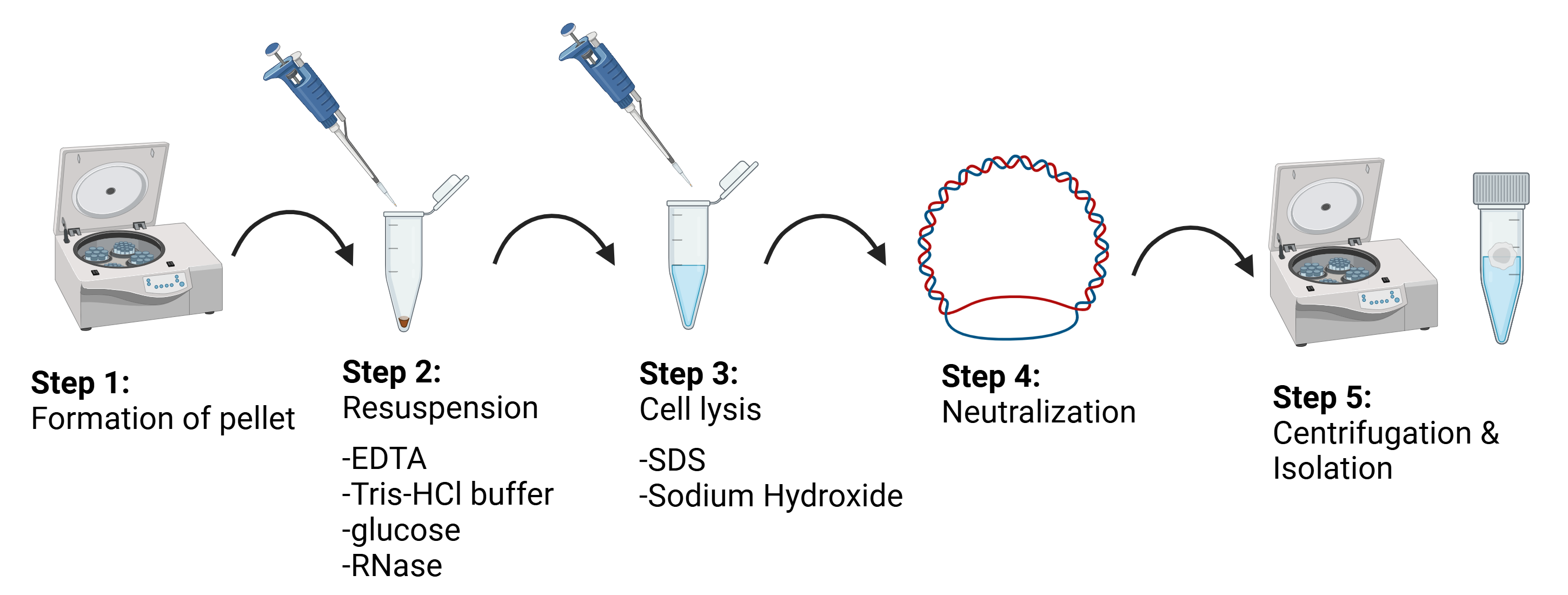
Steps of alkaline lysis

=== Chemicals ===
- Sodium dodecyl sulfate (SDS)
- Sodium hydroxide
- Ethylenediaminetetraacetic acid (EDTA)
- Tris hydrochloride (HCl)
- Glucose
- Potassium acetate

== Applications ==
Transformation involves the use of restriction enzymes to cut plasmids at specific locations to allow for insertion of a gene of interest. The recombinant plasmid is then introduced into a bacterial cell where it can replicate independently, allowing the bacterium to express the gene of interest. These plasmids can be used for cloning genes or altering gene expression.

Recombinant protein production is a process in which transformation is carried out with a recombinant DNA that codes for a specific protein. Once the recombinant plasmid has been introduced into the host cell, the protein is then produced by the host cell. Application of this process is common in the medical field with the production of insulin, hormones, and growth factors.

Gene therapy is the modification of an individual's genes to treat a disease or disorder. Gene therapy using plasmids is a potential treatment option for individuals who have a dysfunctional gene causing a disorder. Recombinant DNA of a functional copy of the defective gene can be incorporated into a plasmid host cell. This provides the host cell with a functional gene to treat the disorder.

DNA vaccines are a type of vaccine that uses plasmid DNA to trigger an immune response in the body. The plasmid DNA codes for an antigen which is detected by the immune system as foreign. The immune system carries out an immune response which builds immunity. If the actual virus the vaccine was created for enters the body, the immune system will be familiar with how to attack. The DNA vaccine can be personalized for the virus based on the plasmid recombinant DNA.
