= VectorDB =

Content
- Description: Characterization and classification of nucleic acid vectors

Contact
- Primary citation: Cochrane & al. (2010)

Access
- Website: http://genome-www.stanford.edu/vectordb//

Miscellaneous
- Version: unsupported

VectorDB was a database of sequence information for common vectors used in molecular biology

== See also ==
- Univec
- Plasmid
