= Circular DNA =

Circular DNA is DNA that forms a closed loop and has no ends. Examples include:

- Plasmids, mobile genetic elements
- cccDNA, formed by some viruses inside cell nuclei
- Circular bacterial chromosomes
- Mitochondrial DNA (mtDNA)
- Chloroplast DNA (cpDNA), and that of other plastids
- Extrachromosomal circular DNA (eccDNA)

== See also ==
- Circular chromosome
- Inverse polymerase chain reaction (Inverse PCR), technique for finding unknown DNA flanking known DNA
- Effect of circular DNA on gel electrophoresis
- Cyclic nucleotide
- Cyclic adenosine monophosphate (cAMP)
- Cyclic guanosine monophosphate (cGMP)
- Circular RNA
- Cyclic peptide
