= ParMRC system =

The ParMRC system is a mechanism for sorting DNA plasmids to opposite ends of a bacterial cell during cell division. It has three components: ParM, an actin-like protein that forms a long filament to push two plasmids apart, ParR, which binds the plasmid to ParM and generates the ParM filament, and parC, which is a DNA sequence on the plasmid that anchors ParR to itself.

== Description ==
There the plasmids are segregated and can replicate without interference from the chromosomal DNA. During cell division many plasmids are plagued with low copy numbers and thus evolved active segregation to avoid plasmid loss during cell division The process of this segregation is carried out by a small number of components, three to be exact, in the DNA, with incredible efficiency. The three components, a parC DNA site, and two proteins parR and parM all combine to create the ParMRC system, a type II plasmid partitioning system.

The process by which the plasmids are segregated from the chromosomal DNA is not an extremely complicated one and contains just three components. The first component ParM is an actin-like protein. The second is a DNA-binding adaptor protein known as ParR. The last component is a centromere-like region called ParC. The process works using all three of these components and has been evolved to work extremely efficiently. In the cell the ParM protein filaments search for plasmids. Next, they find the ParR and ParC that are headed to DNA molecules and push them to opposite poles of the cell in order to segregate them.

This type of process using filament forming actin-like protein (ParM) to move DNA to opposite sides of the cell has been adopted by several Bacteria as their main plasmid segregation systems, due to its efficiency. This discovery as well as improvements in technology, such as higher resolution in light microscopy, will soon allow scientists to track individual molecules in cells to reveal even more about this ParMRC system.
