= Plasmidome =

Plasmids present in an environment

An environment's plasmidome refers to the plasmids present in it. The term is a portmanteau of the two English words Plasmid and Kingdom. In biological research, plasmidome may refer to the actual plasmids that were found and isolated from a certain microorganism by means of culturing isolated microorganism and investigating the plasmids it possesses or by taking an environmental sample and performing a metagenomic survey using next generation sequencing methods in order to reveal and characterize plasmid genomes that belong to that environment.

== See also ==
- Plasmid
