= RNAI =

Biological molecule

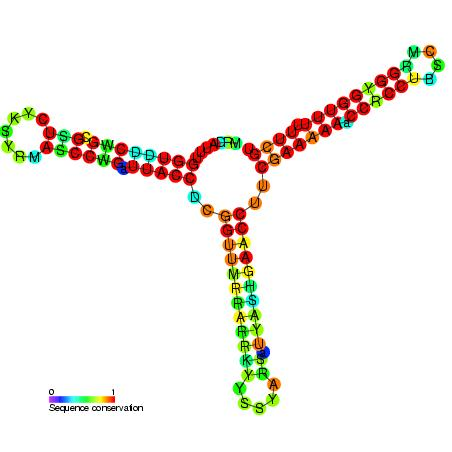
- Predicted secondary structure and sequence conservation of RNAI

Identifiers
- Symbol: RNAI
- Rfam: RF00106

Other data
- RNA type: Gene; antisense
- Domain(s): Bacteria
- SO: SO:0000644
- PDB structures: PDBe

RNAI is a non-coding RNA that is an antisense repressor of the replication of some E. coli plasmids, including ColE1. Plasmid replication is usually initiated by RNAII, which acts as a primer by binding to its template DNA. The complementary RNAI binds RNAII prohibiting it from its initiation role. The rate of degradation of RNAI is therefore a major factor in the control of plasmid replication. This rate of degradation is aided by the pcnB (plasmid copy number B) gene product, which polyadenylates the 3' end of RNAI targeting it for degradation by PNPase.
