= Ferroglobus =

Scientific classification
- Domain: Archaea
- Kingdom: Methanobacteriati
- Phylum: Methanobacteriota
- Class: Archaeoglobi
- Order: Archaeoglobales
- Family: Archaeoglobaceae
- Genus: Ferroglobus; Hafenbradl et al. 1997

Type species
- Ferroglobus placidus Hafenbradl et al. 1997

Species
- F. placidus

Genus of archaea

Ferroglobus is a genus of the Archaeoglobaceae.

Ferroglobus is a hyperthermophilic genus phylogenetically located within the Euryarchaeota. It consists of one species, F. placidus, isolated from hydrothermal vent sediment off the coast of Italy. F. placidus grows best at 85 °C and a neutral pH. It cannot grow at temperatures below 65 °C or above 95 °C. Cells possess an S-layer cell wall and archaella.

Metabolically, Ferroglobus is quite unique compared to its relative Archaeoglobus. F. placidus was the first hyperthermophile discovered to grow anaerobically by oxidizing aromatic compounds such as benzoate coupled to the reduction of ferric iron (Fe^{3+}) to ferrous iron (Fe^{2+}). Hydrogen gas (H_{2}) and sulfide (H_{2}S) can also be used as energy sources. Due to its anaerobic lifestyle, nitrate (NO_{3}^{−}) is used as a terminal electron acceptor whereby it is converted to nitrite (NO_{2}^{−}). Thiosulfate (S_{2}O_{3}^{2−}) can also be used as a terminal electron acceptor. F. placidus was the first archaeon discovered that can anaerobically oxidize iron coupled to the reduction of nitrate. It is thought that the presence of organisms similar to F. placidus in the ancient, anoxic Earth may have led to the formation of banded iron formations often found in ancient rocks.

== See also ==
- List of Archaea genera
