= Replicon (genetics) =

DNA region replicating from a single origin

A replicon is a region of an organism's genome that is independently replicated from a single origin of replication. A bacterial chromosome contains a single origin, and therefore the whole bacterial chromosome is a replicon. The chromosomes of archaea and eukaryotes can have multiple origins of replication, and so their chromosomes may consist of several replicons. The concept of the replicon was formulated in 1963 by François Jacob, Sydney Brenner, and Jacques Cuzin as a part of their replicon model for replication initiation. According to the replicon model, two components control replication initiation: the replicator and the initiator. The replicator is the entire DNA sequence (including, but not limited to the origin of replication) required to direct the initiation of DNA replication. The initiator is the protein that recognizes the replicator and activates replication initiation.

Sometimes in bacteriology, the term "replicon" is only used to refer to chromosomes containing a single origin of replication and therefore excludes the genomes of archaea and eukaryotes which can have several origins.

== Prokaryotes ==
For most prokaryotic chromosomes, the replicon is the entire chromosome. One notable exception comes from archaea, where two Sulfolobus species have been shown to contain three replicons. Examples of bacterial species that have been found to possess multiple replicons include Rhodobacter sphaeroides (two), Vibrio cholerae, and Burkholderia multivorans (three). These "secondary" (or tertiary) chromosomes are often described as molecules that are intermediate between a true chromosome and a plasmid and are sometimes called "chromids". Various Azospirillum species possess seven replicons; A. lipoferum, for instance, has one bacterial chromosome, five chromids, and one plasmid. Plasmids and bacteriophages are usually replicated as single replicons, but large plasmids in Gram-negative bacteria have been shown to carry several replicons.

== Eukaryotes ==
For eukaryotic chromosomes, there are multiple replicons per chromosome. Known examples range in size from 10 to 330 kilobases. A cluster of replicons replicates simultaneously. But different clusters start replicating at different times during S phase, depending on their location along the chromosomes. In general, clusters nearer the centromere replicate earlier. Fine structure analysis of chromosomal origins of replication is limited to a single model eukaryote, Saccharomyces cerevisiae. Therefore, no general picture of a replicon as replicator and initiator in eukaryotes has been achieved.

In the case of mitochondria, the definition of replicons is somewhat confused, as they use unidirectional replication with two separate origins.

== Non-cellular entities ==
Non-cellular entities such as viruses, plasmids, transposons, retrotransposons, viroids, virusoids and RNA satellites are also replicons. Patrick Forterre of the Pasteur Institute has coined the term "orphan replicon" to refer to those that are not viruses; i.e., that lack a capsid.

== See also ==
- DNA replication
- Origin of replication
- Secondary chromosome
