= Pseudomonas nitroreducens =

Scientific classification
- Domain: Bacteria
- Kingdom: Pseudomonadati
- Phylum: Pseudomonadota
- Class: Gammaproteobacteria
- Order: Pseudomonadales
- Family: Pseudomonadaceae
- Genus: Pseudomonas
- Species: P. nitroreducens

Binomial name
- Pseudomonas nitroreducens Iizuka and Komagata 1964

Type strain
- ATCC 33634 CCUG 12538; CIP 106747; DSM 14399; IAM 1439; JCM 2782; NBRC 12694

Synonyms
- Pseudomonas multiresinivorans Mohn et al. 1999

Species of bacterium

Pseudomonas nitroreducens is an aerobic, Gram-negative soil bacterium first isolated from oil brine in Japan. It is able to synthesise polyhydroxybutyrate homopolymer (a polyester) from medium chain length fatty acids. Based on 16S rRNA analysis, P. nitroreducens has been placed in the P. aeruginosa group.
