= Clone manager =

Bioinformatics software work suite

Clone Manager is a commercial bioinformatics software work suite of Sci-Ed, that supports molecular biologists with data management and allows them to perform certain in silico preanalysis.

This type of bioinformatics software is used for managing, analyzing and visualizing DNA and protein sequence data essential for molecular biology.

For enzyme read control, sequence processing of identical individuals, cloning simulation, graphic map drawing, primer design and analysis, global and local sequence alignment, similarity search, laboratory scale sequence assembly projects A comprehensive set of tools.
