= Geoglobus =

Scientific classification
- Domain: Archaea
- Kingdom: Methanobacteriati
- Phylum: Methanobacteriota
- Class: Archaeoglobi
- Order: Archaeoglobales
- Family: Archaeoglobaceae
- Genus: Geoglobus; Kashefi et al. 2002

Type species
- Geoglobus ahangari Kashefi et al. 2002

Species
- G. acetivorans; G. ahangari

Genus of archaea

Geoglobus is a hyperthermophilic member of the Archaeoglobaceae within the Euryarchaeota. It consists of two species, the first, G. ahangari, isolated from the Guaymas Basin hydrothermal system located deep within the Gulf of California. As a hyperthermophile, it grows best at a temperature of 88 °C and cannot grow at temperatures below 65 °C or above 90 °C. It possess an S-layer cell wall and a single flagellum. G. ahangari is an anaerobe, using poorly soluble ferric iron (Fe^{3+}) as a terminal electron acceptor. It can grow either autotrophically using hydrogen gas (H_{2}) or heterotrophically using a large number of organic compounds, including several types of fatty acids, as energy sources. G. ahangari was the first archaeon isolated capable of using hydrogen gas coupled to iron reduction as an energy source and the first anaerobe isolated capable of using long-chain fatty acids as an energy source.

A second species was described as G. acetivorans, which also uses iron as its terminal electron acceptor..

== See also ==
- List of Archaea genera
