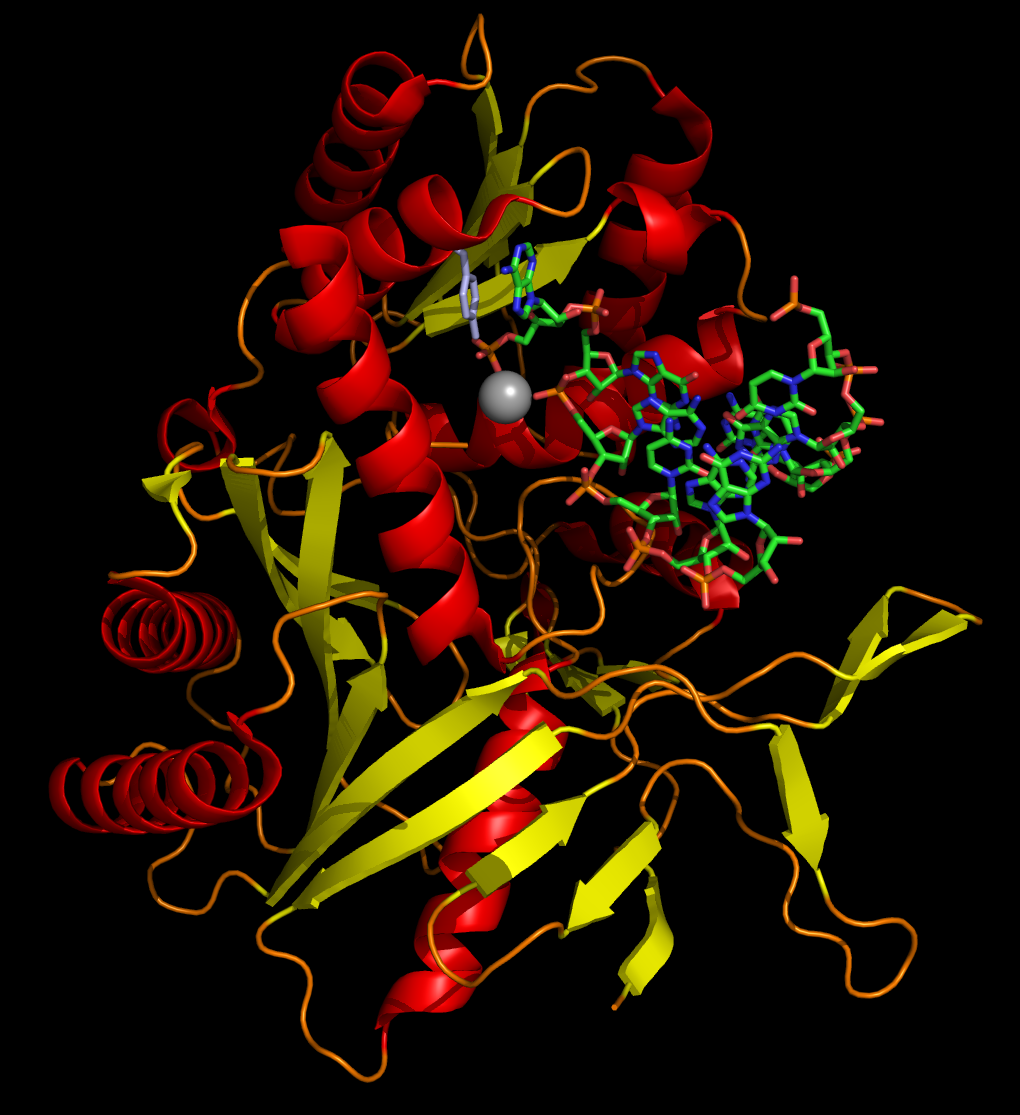
- The PIWI domain of an argonaute protein from A. fulgidus, bound to a short double-stranded RNA fragment and illustrating the base-pairing and aromatic stacking stabilization of the bound conformation.

Scientific classification
- Domain: Archaea
- Kingdom: Methanobacteriati
- Phylum: Methanobacteriota
- Class: Archaeoglobi
- Order: Archaeoglobales
- Family: Archaeoglobaceae; Huber and Stetter 2002

Genera
- Archaeoglobus; Ferroglobus; Geoglobus; "Ca. Methanoglobus"; "Ca. Methanomixotrophus"; "Ca. Methanoproducendum"

Synonyms
- "Archaeoglobaceae" Stetter 1989

= Archaeoglobaceae =

Family of archaea

Archaeoglobaceae are a family of the Archaeoglobales. All known genera within the Archaeoglobaceae are hyperthermophilic and can be found near undersea hydrothermal vents. Archaeoglobaceae are the only family in the order Archaeoglobales, which is the only order in the class Archaeoglobi.

== Mode of metabolism ==
While all genera within the Archaeoglobaceae are related to each other phylogenetically, the mode of metabolism used by each of these organisms is unique. Archaeoglobus are chemoorganotrophic sulfate-reducing archaea, the only known member of the Archaea that possesses this type of metabolism. Ferroglobus, in contrast, are chemolithotrophic organisms that couple the oxidation of ferrous iron to the reduction of nitrate. Geoglobus are iron reducing-archaea that use hydrogen gas or organic compounds as energy sources.

== Characteristic and genera ==
Archaeoglobaceae have three genera and here are some brief differences between them:

- Archaeoglobus: This genus contains the most well-known and studied members of the Archaeoglobaceae family. They are thermophilic sulfate-reducing archaea that are found in hydrothermal vents and oil reservoirs. They can grow at high temperatures and use a variety of organic compounds as electron donors.
- Ferroglobus: This genus contains a single species, Ferroglobus placidus, which is found in hydrothermal vents. They are thermophilic and can grow at high temperatures, but they differ from other members of the family in that they use iron as an electron donor instead of organic compounds.
- Geoglobus: This genus contains a single species, Geoglobus acetivorans, which is found in hydrothermal vents. They are thermophilic and can grow at high temperatures, and they differ from other members of the family in that they use acetate as an electron donor.

== Living environments ==
Archaeoglobus species are found in a variety of extreme environments, including deep-sea hydrothermal vents, oil reservoirs, and hot springs. These environments are characterized by high temperatures, high pressures, and low oxygen concentrations, which make them inhospitable to most other forms of life (Topçuoğlu et al 2019). They are able to thrive in these environments by using a variety of metabolic pathways to obtain energy, and by producing a range of heat-shock proteins and other stress-response mechanisms that help them to survive in these extreme conditions. They are extremophiles, which means they can also be found in environments that are high in salt content, such as in salt flats or Salt Lake. Archaeoglobaceae are able to thrive in these extreme environments because they are able to use a variety of different minerals and gases to make energy. For example, some species of Archaeoglobaceae are able to use sulfur in a process called dissimilatory sulfate reduction, which allows them to produce energy without the need for oxygen. Other species of Archaeoglobaceae are able to use carbon dioxide or hydrogen gas as a source of energy(Topçuoğlu et al 2019).

In addition to their ability to use different energy sources, some species of Archaeoglobaceae are also known to form symbiotic relationships with other organisms. For example, some species of Archaeoglobaceae have been found living in association with tube worms, which are able to extract nutrients from the hydrothermal vent environment and provide them to the bacteria in exchange for energy. These symbiotic relationships are thought to be important for the survival of both the bacteria and the tube worms in these extreme environments(Topçuoğlu et al 2019).

== Phylogeny ==
The currently accepted taxonomy is based on the List of Prokaryotic names with Standing in Nomenclature (LPSN) and National Center for Biotechnology Information (NCBI).

16S rRNA based LTP_07_2026

- - Geoglobus Kashefi et al. 2002
  - - Archaeoglobus Stetter 1988
    - - - Ferroglobus Hafenbradl et al. 1997
        - Archaeoglobus~1
      - - Archaeoglobus~2

53 marker proteins based GTDB 11-RS232

- - - Archaeoglobus_C
    - Archaeoglobus_A
  - - Archaeoglobus_B
    - - - Ferroglobus
        - Geoglobus
      - Archaeoglobus

== See also ==
- List of Archaea genera

== Bibliography ==
- Huber, Harald; Hohn, Michael J.; Rachel, Reinhard; Fuchs, Tanja; Wimmer, Verena C.; Stetter, Karl O. (May 2002). "A new phylum of Archaea represented by a nanosized hyperthermophilic symbiont". Nature. 417 (6884): 63–67. Bibcode:2002Natur.417...63H. doi:10.1038/417063a. hdl:21.11116/0000-0002-12CD-3. PMID 11986665. S2CID 4395094.
- Klenk, Hans-Peter; Clayton, Rebecca A.; Tomb, Jean-Francois; White, Owen; Nelson, Karen E.; Ketchum, Karen A.; Dodson, Robert J.; Gwinn, Michelle; Hickey, Erin K.; Peterson, Jeremy D.; Richardson, Delwood L.; Kerlavage, Anthony R.; Graham, David E.; Kyrpides, Nikos C.; Fleischmann, Robert D.; Quackenbush, John; Lee, Norman H.; Sutton, Granger G.; Gill, Steven; Kirkness, Ewen F.; Dougherty, Brian A.; McKenney, Keith; Adams, Mark D.; Loftus, Brendan; Peterson, Scott; Reich, Claudia I.; McNeil, Leslie K.; Badger, Jonathan H.; Glodek, Anna; Zhou, Lixin; Overbeek, Ross; Gocayne, Jeannine D.; Weidman, Janice F.; McDonald, Lisa; Utterback, Teresa; Cotton, Matthew D.; Spriggs, Tracy; Artiach, Patricia; Kaine, Brian P.; Sykes, Sean M.; Sadow, Paul W.; D'Andrea, Kurt P.; Bowman, Cheryl; Fujii, Claire; Garland, Stacey A.; Mason, Tanya M.; Olsen, Gary J.; Fraser, Claire M.; Smith, Hamilton O.; Woese, Carl R.; Venter, J. Craig (November 1997). "The complete genome sequence of the hyperthermophilic, sulphate-reducing archaeon Archaeoglobus fulgidus". Nature. 390 (6658): 364–370. Bibcode:1997Natur.390..364K. doi:10.1038/37052. PMID 9389475. S2CID 83683005.
- Slobodkina, Galina; Allioux, Maxime; Merkel, Alexander; Cambon-Bonavita, Marie-Anne; Alain, Karine; Jebbar, Mohamed; Slobodkin, Alexander (16 July 2021). "Physiological and Genomic Characterization of a Hyperthermophilic Archaeon Archaeoglobus neptunius sp. nov. Isolated From a Deep-Sea Hydrothermal Vent Warrants the Reclassification of the Genus Archaeoglobus". Frontiers in Microbiology. 12 679245. doi:10.3389/fmicb.2021.679245. PMC 8322695. PMID 34335500.
- Kim, Daehyun D.; O'Farrell, Corynne; Toth, Courtney R. A.; Montoya, Oscar; Gieg, Lisa M.; Kwon, Tae-Hyuk; Yoon, Sukhwan (July 2018). "Microbial community analyses of produced waters from high-temperature oil reservoirs reveal unexpected similarity between geographically distant oil reservoirs". Microbial Biotechnology. 11 (4): 788–796. doi:10.1111/1751-7915.13281. PMC 6011920. PMID 29806176. S2CID 44082150.
