= Cryptic plasmids =

In molecular biology, a cryptic plasmid is a plasmid that doesn't appear to provide any clear advantage to its host, yet still persists in bacterial populations. These plasmids appear to lack any genetic functions of interest and do not seem to contain genes that could provide beneficial functions to their hosts. Given the lack of a clear advantage to their hosts and the likely cost of maintaining them, these plasmids are often referred to as selfish elements or genetic parasites.The maintenance of cryptic plasmids might be explained by mechanisms like horizontal gene transfer (e.g., conjugation, transduction) that balance their loss due to segregation. However, cryptic plasmids could potentially be important in antibiotic resistance, by contributing to heteroresistance in bacterial populations.

They have been found to be highly abundant, as seen in Lactobacillus where most plasmids are cryptic.
