= Plasmid partition system =

Mechanism for plasmid inheritance in bacterial cell division

A plasmid partition system is a mechanism that ensures the stable inheritance of plasmids during bacterial cell division. Each plasmid has its independent replication system which controls the number of copies of the plasmid in a cell. The higher the copy number, the more likely the two daughter cells will contain the plasmid. Generally, each molecule of plasmid diffuses randomly, so the probability of having a plasmid-less daughter cell is 2^{1−N}, where N is the number of copies. For instance, if there are 2 copies of a plasmid in a cell, there is 50% chance of having one plasmid-less daughter cell. However, high-copy number plasmids have a cost for the hosting cell. This metabolic burden is lower for low-copy plasmids, but those have a higher probability of plasmid loss after a few generations. To control vertical transmission of plasmids, in addition to controlled-replication systems, bacterial plasmids use different maintenance strategies, such as multimer resolution systems, post-segregational killing systems (addiction modules), and partition systems.

== General properties of partition systems ==
Plasmid copies are paired around a centromere-like site and then separated in the two daughter cells. Partition systems involve three elements, organized in an auto-regulated operon:

- A centromere-like DNA site
- Centromere binding proteins (CBP)
- The motor protein

The centromere-like DNA site is required in cis for plasmid stability. It often contains one or more inverted repeats which are recognized by multiple CBPs. This forms a nucleoprotein complex termed the partition complex. This complex recruits the motor protein, which is a nucleotide triphosphatase (NTPase). The NTPase uses energy from NTP binding and hydrolysis to directly or indirectly move and attach plasmids to specific host location (e.g. opposite bacterial cell poles).

The partition systems are divided in four types, based primarily on the type of NTPases:

- Type I : Walker type P-loop ATPase
- Type II : Actin-like ATPase
- Type III : tubulin-like GTPase
- Type IV : No NTPase

Name of the different elements in the different types
| Type | Motor protein (NTPase) | Centromere binding protein (CBP) | Centromere-like binding site | Other proteins |
|---|---|---|---|---|
| Type I | ParA | ParB or ParG | parS (Ia) or parC (Ib) | |
| Type II | ParM | ParR | parC | |
| Type III | TubZ | TubR | tubS | TubY |

== Type I partition system ==
This system is also used by most bacteria for chromosome segregation. Type I partition systems are composed of an ATPase which contains Walker motifs and a CBP which is structurally distinct in type Ia and Ib. ATPases and CBP from type Ia are longer than the ones from type Ib, but both CBPs contain an arginine finger in their N-terminal part. ParA proteins from different plasmids and bacterial species show 25 to 30% of sequence identity to the protein ParA of the plasmid P1. The partition of type I system uses a "diffusion-ratchet" mechanism. This mechanism works as follows:

1. Dimers of ParA-ATP dynamically bind to nucleoid DNA
2. ParA in its ATP-bound state interacts with ParB bound to parS
3. ParB bound to parS stimulates the release of ParA from the nucleoid region surrounding the plasmid
4. The plasmid then chases the resulting ParA gradient on the perimeter of the ParA depleted region of the nucleoid
5. The ParA that was released from the nucleoid behind the plasmid's movement redistributes to other regions of the nucleoid after a delay
6. After plasmid replication, the sister copies segregate to opposite cell halves as they chase ParA on the nucleoid in opposite directions

There are likely to be differences in the details of type I mechanisms.

Type 1 partition has been mathematically modelled with variations in the mechanism described above.

=== Type Ia ===
The CBP of this type consists in three domains:

- N-terminal NTPase binding domain
- Central Helix-Turn-Helix (HTH) domain
- C-terminal dimer-domain

=== Type Ib ===
The CBP of this type, also known as parG, is composed of:

- N-terminal NTPase binding domain
- Ribon-Helix-Helix (RHH) domain

For this type, the parS site is called parC.

== Type II partition system ==
This system is the best understood of the plasmid partition system. It is composed of an actin-like ATPase, ParM, and a CBP called ParR. The centromere like site, parC contains two sets of five 11 base pair direct repeats separated by the parMR promoter. The amino-acid sequence identity can go down to 15% between ParM and other actin-like ATPase.

The mechanism of partition involved here is a pushing mechanism:

1. ParR binds to parC and pairs plasmids which form a nucleoprotein complex, or partition complex
2. The partition complex serves as nucleation point for the polymerization of ParM; ParM-ATP complex inserts at this point and push plasmids apart
3. The insertion leads to hydrolysis of ParM-ATP complex, leading to depolymerization of the filament
4. At cell division, plasmids copies are at each cell extremity, and will end up in future daughter cell

The filament of ParM is regulated by the polymerization allowed by the presence the partition complex (ParR-parC), and by the depolymerization controlled by the ATPase activity of ParM.

== Type III partition system ==
The type III partition system is the most recently discovered partition system. It is composed of tubulin-like GTPase termed TubZ, and the CBP is termed TubR. Amino-acid sequence identity can go down to 21% for TubZ proteins.

The mechanism is similar to a treadmill mechanism:

1. Multiple TubR dimer binds to the centromere-like region stbDRs of the plasmids.
2. Contact between TubR and filament of treadmilling TubZ polymer. TubZ subunits are lost from the - end and are added to the + end.
3. TubR-plasmid complex is pulled along the growing polymer until it reaches the cell pole.
4. Interaction with membrane is likely to trigger the release of the plasmid.

The net result being transport of partition complex to the cell pole.

== Other partition systems ==
=== R388 partition system ===
The partition system of the plasmid R388 has been found within the stb operon. This operon is composed of three genes, stbA, stbB and stbC.

- StbA protein is a DNA-binding protein (identical to ParM) and is strictly required for the stability and intracellular positioning of plasmid R388 in E. coli. StbA binds a cis-acting sequence, the stbDRs.

The StbA-stbDRs complex may be used to pair plasmid the host chromosome, using indirectly the bacterial partitioning system.

- StbB protein has a Walker-type ATPase motif, it favors for conjugation but is not required for plasmid stability over generations.
- StbC is an orphan protein of unknown function. StbC doesn't seem to be implicated in either partitioning or conjugation.

StbA and StbB have opposite but connected effect related to conjugation.

This system has been proposed to be the type IV partition system. It is thought to be a derivative of the type I partition system, given the similar operon organization. This system represents the first evidence for a mechanistic interplay between plasmid segregation and conjugation processes.

=== pSK1 partition system ===
pSK1 is a plasmid from Staphylococcus aureus. This plasmid has a partition system (reviewed in) determined by a single gene, par, previously known as orf245. This gene does not effect the plasmid copy number nor the grow rate (excluding its implication in a post-segregational killing system). A centromere-like binding sequence is present upstream of the par gene, and is composed of seven direct repeats and one inverted repeat.
