= Iteron =

Type of repeated DNA sequence

Iterons are directly repeated DNA sequences which play an important role in regulation of plasmid copy number in bacterial cells. It is one among the three negative regulatory elements found in plasmids which control its copy number. The others are antisense RNAs and ctRNAs. Iterons complex with cognate replication (Rep) initiator proteins to achieve the required regulatory effect.

== Regulation of replication ==
Iterons have an important role in plasmid replication. An iteron-containing plasmid origin of replication can be found containing about five iterons about 20 base pairs in length total. These iterons provide a saturation site for initiator receptor proteins and promote replication, thus increasing plasmid copy number in a given cell.

=== Limiting factors of initiation ===
There are four main limiting factors leading to no initiation of replication in iterons:

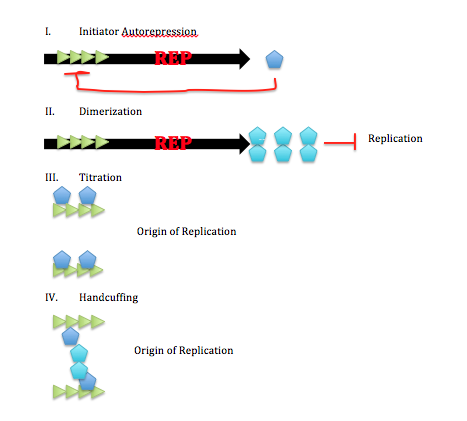
Four main limiting factors leading to no initiation of replication in iterons

- Transcriptional autorepression
- Initiator dimerization
- Initiator titration
- Handcuffing

Transcriptional auto-repression is thought to reduce initiator synthesis by repressing the formation of the Rep proteins. Since these proteins work to promote binding of replication machinery, replication can be halted in this form. Another factor used to stop replication is known as dimerization. It works to dimerize these Rep proteins, and as a result, monomers of these proteins are no longer in a high enough concentration to initiate replication. Another limiting factor, titration, occurs after replication, and works to prevent saturation by distributing monomers to daughter origins so that none are fully saturated. Finally, handcuffing refers to pairing origins leading to inactivation. This is mediated by monomers, and inactivation is due to steric hindrance between the origins.

Another less prevalent limitation thought to be present in these iterons is the presence of extra repeats. If a plasmid contains an extra supply of iterons outside of the saturation site, this can decrease plasmid copy number. In contrast, removing these extra iterons will increase copy number.

== Replicon structure ==
Plasmids are known to have very similar structure when under control of iterons. This structure consists of an origin of replication upstream of a gene that codes for a replication initiator protein. The iterons themselves are known to cover about half of the origin of replication. Usually, iterons on the same plasmid are highly conserved, whereas comparing iterons on different plasmids still exhibit homology yet are not as highly conserved. This suggests that iterons could be evolutionarily related.

== Replication initiator proteins ==
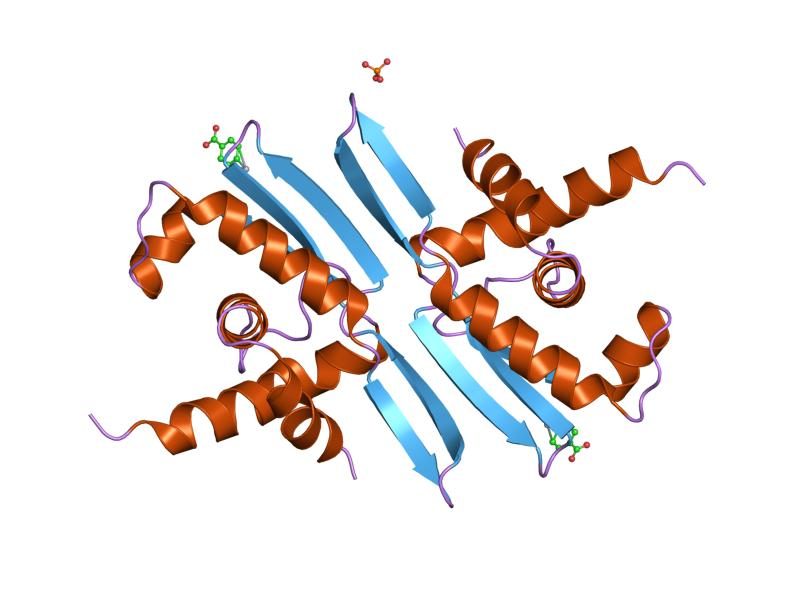
Representation of the molecular structure of protein RepA, a known rep protein used in iterons

The replication initiator protein (Rep) plays a key role in initiation of replication in plasmids. In its monomer form, Rep binds an iteron and promotes replication. The protein itself is known to contain two independent N-terminal and C-terminal globular domains that subsequently bind to two domains of the iteron. The dimer version of the protein is generally inactive in iteron binding; however, it is known to bind to the repE operator. This operator contains half of the iteron sequence, making it able to bind the dimer and promote gene expression.

Plasmids containing iterons are all organized very similarly in structure. The gene for Rep proteins is usually found directly downstream of the origin of replication. This means that the iterons themselves are known to regulate the synthesis of the rep proteins.
