= ParABS system =

The parABS system is a broadly conserved molecular mechanism for plasmid partitioning and chromosome segregation in bacteria. Originally identified as a genetic element required for faithful partitioning of low-copy-number plasmids, it consists of three components: the ParA ATPase, the ParB DNA-binding protein, and the cis-acting parS sequence. The parA and parB genes are typically found in the same operon, with parS elements located within or adjacent to this operon. Collectively, these components function to ensure accurate partitioning of plasmids or whole chromosomes between bacterial daughter cells prior to cell division.

== Mechanism ==
Based on chromatin immunoprecipitation (ChIP) experiments, ParB has the ability to bind not only to high-affinity parS sites but also to adjacent nonspecific DNA, a behavior known as "spreading". The ParB-DNA complex is thought to be translocated by a Brownian ratchet mechanism involving the ParA ATPase: ParA binds DNA nonspecifically in its ATP-bound state but much more weakly in its ADP-bound state. The ParB-DNA complex binds to ATP-bound ParA, stimulating its ATPase activity and its dissociation from DNA. In this way, the ParB-DNA complex can be translocated by chasing a receding wave. This translocation mechanism has been observed by fluorescence microscopy both in vivo and more recently in vitro with purified components.
