= Plasmid =

Small DNA molecule within a cell

A plasmid is a circular DNA molecule, separate from the genome, that can replicate inside of bacteria. This allows scientists to copy, multiply, and express a gene of interest.

A plasmid is a small, extrachromosomal DNA molecule within a cell that is physically separated from chromosomal DNA and can replicate independently. They are most commonly found as small circular, double-stranded DNA molecules in bacteria and archaea; however plasmids are sometimes present in eukaryotic organisms as well. Plasmids often carry useful genes, such as those involved in antibiotic resistance, virulence, secondary metabolism and bioremediation. While chromosomes are large and contain all the essential genetic information for living under normal conditions, plasmids are usually very small and contain additional genes for special circumstances.

Artificial plasmids are widely used as vectors in molecular cloning, serving to drive the replication of recombinant DNA sequences within host organisms. In the laboratory, plasmids may be introduced into a cell via transformation. Synthetic plasmids are available for procurement over the internet by various vendors using submitted sequences typically designed with software, if a design does not work the vendor may make additional edits from the submission.

Plasmids are considered replicons, units of DNA capable of replicating autonomously within a suitable host. However, plasmids, like viruses, are not generally classified as life. Plasmids are transmitted from one bacterium to another (even of another species) mostly through conjugation. This host-to-host transfer of genetic material is one mechanism of horizontal gene transfer, and plasmids are considered part of the mobilome. Unlike viruses, which encase their genetic material in a protective protein coat called a capsid, plasmids are "naked" DNA and do not encode genes necessary to encase the genetic material for transfer to a new host; however, some classes of plasmids encode the conjugative "sex" pilus necessary for their own transfer. Plasmids vary in size from 1 to over 400 kbp, and the number of identical plasmids in a single cell can range from one up to thousands.

== History ==
The term plasmid was coined in 1952 by the American molecular biologist Joshua Lederberg to refer to "any extrachromosomal hereditary determinant." The term's early usage included any bacterial genetic material that exists extrachromosomally for at least part of its replication cycle, but because that description includes bacterial viruses, the notion of plasmid was refined over time to refer to genetic elements that reproduce autonomously. Later in 1968, it was decided that the term plasmid should be adopted as the term for extrachromosomal genetic element, and to distinguish it from viruses, the definition was narrowed to genetic elements that exist exclusively or predominantly outside of the chromosome, can replicate autonomously, and contribute to transferring mobile elements between unrelated bacteria.

== Properties and characteristics ==
There are two types of plasmid integration into a host bacteria: Non-integrating plasmids replicate as with the top instance, whereas episomes, the lower example, can integrate into the host chromosome.

In order for plasmids to replicate independently within a cell, they must possess a stretch of DNA that can act as an origin of replication. The self-replicating unit, in this case, the plasmid, is called a replicon. A typical bacterial replicon may consist of a number of elements, such as the gene for plasmid-specific replication initiation protein (Rep), repeating units called iterons, DnaA boxes, and an adjacent AT-rich region. Smaller plasmids make use of the host replicative enzymes to make copies of themselves, while larger plasmids may carry genes specific for the replication of those plasmids. A few types of plasmids can also insert into the host chromosome, and these integrative plasmids are sometimes referred to as episomes in prokaryotes.

Plasmids almost always carry at least one gene. Many of the genes carried by a plasmid are beneficial for the host cells, for example: enabling the host cell to survive in an environment that would otherwise be lethal or restrictive for growth. Some of these genes encode traits for antibiotic resistance or resistance to heavy metal, while others may produce virulence factors that enable a bacterium to colonize a host and overcome its defences or have specific metabolic functions that allow the bacterium to utilize a particular nutrient, including the ability to degrade recalcitrant or toxic organic compounds. Plasmids can also provide bacteria with the ability to fix nitrogen. Some plasmids, called cryptic plasmids, don't appear to provide any clear advantage to its host, yet still persist in bacterial populations. However, recent studies show that they may play a role in antibiotic resistance by contributing to heteroresistance within bacterial populations.

Naturally occurring plasmids vary greatly in their physical properties. Their size can range from very small mini-plasmids of less than 1-kilobase pairs (kbp) to very large megaplasmids of several megabase pairs (Mbp). At the upper end, little differs between a megaplasmid and a minichromosome. Plasmids are generally circular, but examples of linear plasmids are also known. These linear plasmids require specialized mechanisms to replicate their ends.

Plasmids may be present in an individual cell in varying number, ranging from one to several hundreds. The normal number of copies of plasmid that may be found in a single cell is called the plasmid copy number, and is determined by how the replication initiation is regulated and the size of the molecule. Larger plasmids tend to have lower copy numbers. Low-copy-number plasmids that exist only as one or a few copies in each bacterium are, upon cell division, in danger of being lost in one of the segregating bacteria. Such single-copy plasmids have systems that attempt to actively distribute a copy to both daughter cells. These systems, which include the parABS system and parMRC system, are often referred to as the partition system or partition function of a plasmid.

Plasmids of linear form are unknown among phytopathogens with one exception, Rhodococcus fascians.

== Classifications and types ==
Overview of bacterial conjugation

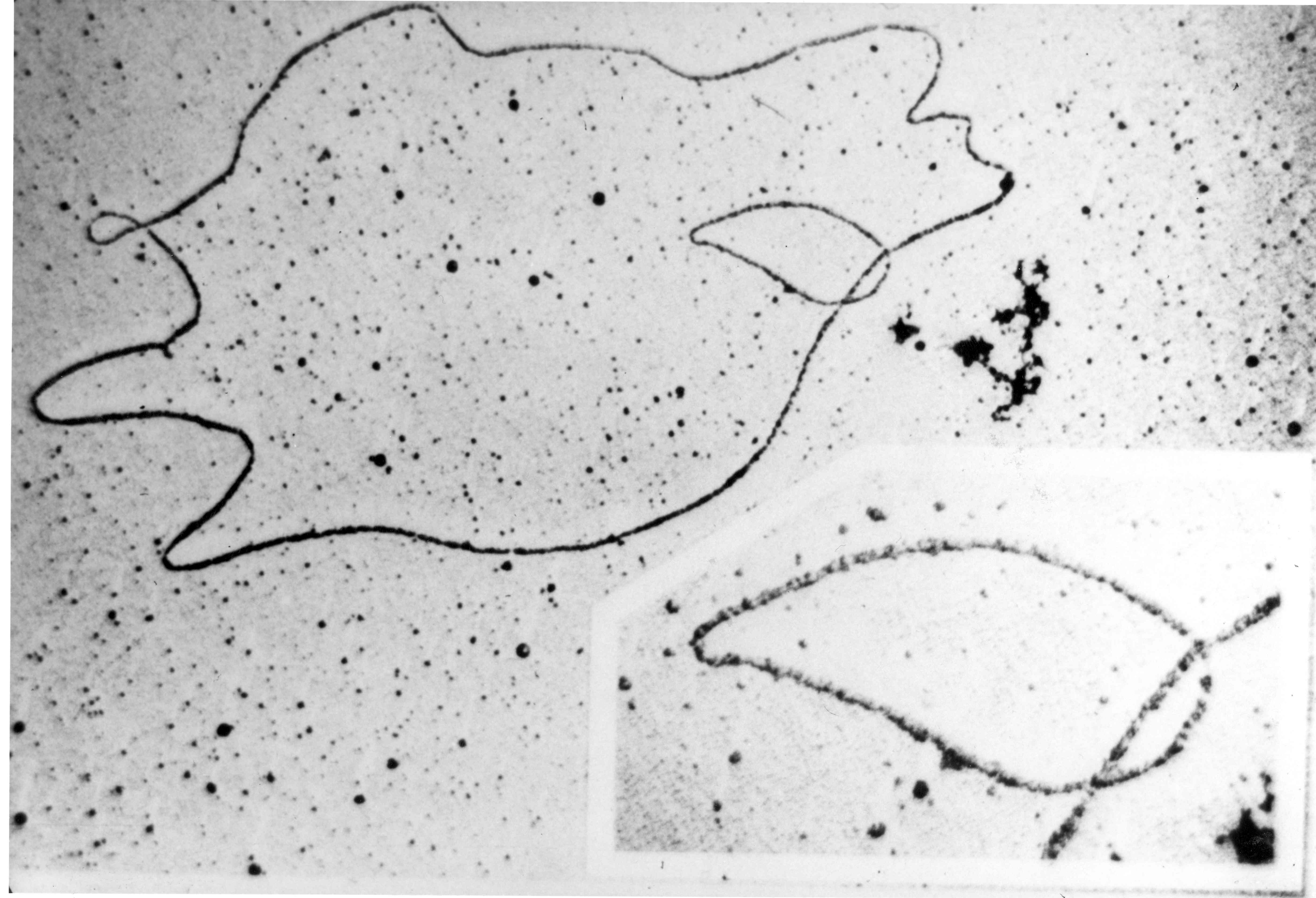
Electron micrograph of a DNA fiber bundle, presumably of a single bacterial chromosome loop

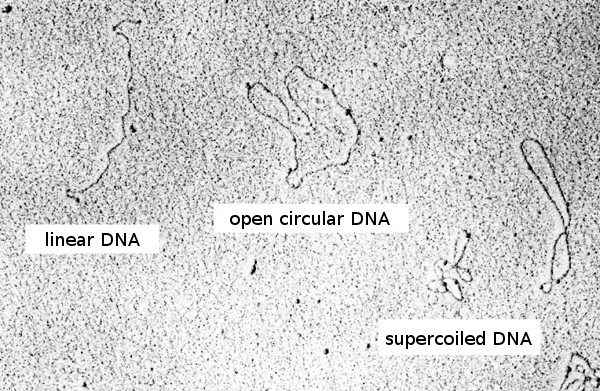
Electron micrograph of a bacterial DNA plasmid (chromosome fragment)

Plasmids may be classified in a number of ways. Plasmids can be broadly classified into conjugative plasmids and non-conjugative plasmids. Conjugative plasmids contain a set of transfer genes which promote sexual conjugation between different cells. In the complex process of conjugation, plasmids may be transferred from one bacterium to another via sex pili encoded by some of the transfer genes (see figure). Non-conjugative plasmids are incapable of initiating conjugation, hence they can be transferred only with the assistance of conjugative plasmids. An intermediate class of plasmids are mobilizable, and carry only a subset of the genes required for transfer. They can parasitize a conjugative plasmid, transferring at high frequency only in its presence.

Plasmids can also be classified into incompatibility groups. A microbe can harbour different types of plasmids, but different plasmids can only exist in a single bacterial cell if they are compatible. If two plasmids are not compatible, one or the other will be rapidly lost from the cell. Different plasmids may therefore be assigned to different incompatibility groups depending on whether they can coexist together. Incompatible plasmids (belonging to the same incompatibility group) normally share the same replication or partition mechanisms and can thus not be kept together in a single cell. Incompatibility typing (or Inc typing) was traditionally achieved by genetic phenotyping methods, testing whether cells stably transmit plasmid pairs to their progeny. This has largely been superseded by genetic methods such as PCR, and more recently by whole-genome sequencing methods with bioinformatic tools such as PlasmidFinder.

Another way to classify plasmids is by function. There are five main classes:

- Fertility F-plasmids, which contain tra genes. They are capable of conjugation and result in the expression of sex pili. F-plasmids are categorized as either (+) or (-) and contribute to the difference of being a donor or recipient during conjugation.
- Resistance (R) plasmids, which contain genes that provide resistance against antibiotics or antibacterial agents was first discovered in 1959. R-factors were seen as the contributing factor for the spread of multidrug resistance in bacteria, some R-plasmids assist in transmissibility of other specifically non- self transmissible R-factors. Historically known as R-factors, before the nature of plasmids was understood.
- Col plasmids, which contain genes that code for bacteriocins, proteins that can kill other bacteria.
- Degradative plasmids, which enable the digestion of unusual substances, e.g. toluene and salicylic acid.
- Virulence plasmids, which turn the bacterium into a pathogen. e.g. Ti plasmid in Agrobacterium tumefaciens. Bacteria under selective pressure will keep plasmids containing virulence factors as it is a cost - benefit for survival, removal of the selective pressure can lead to the loss of a plasmid due to the expenditure of energy needed to keep it is no longer justified.

Plasmids can belong to more than one of these functional groups.

=== Sequences-based plasmid typing ===
With the wider availability of whole genome sequencing which is able to capture the genetic sequence of plasmids, methods have been developed to cluster or type plasmids based on their sequence content. Plasmid multi-locus sequence typing (pMLST) is based on chromosomal Multilocus sequence typing by matching the sequence of replication machinery genes to databases of previously classified sequences. If the sequence allele matches the database, this is used as the plasmid classification, and therefore has higher sensitivity than a simple presence or absence test of these genes.

A related method is to use average nucleotide identity between plasmids to find close genetic neighbours. Tools which use this approach include COPLA and MOB-cluster.

Creating typing classifications using unsupervised learning, that is without a pre-existing database or 'reference-free', has been shown to be useful in grouping plasmids in new datasets without biasing or being limited to representations in a pre-built database—tools to do this include mge-cluster. As plasmid frequently change their gene content and order, modelling genetic distances between them using methods designed for point mutations can lead to poor estimates of the true evolutionary distance between plasmids. Tools such as pling find homologous sequence regions between plasmids, and more accurately reconstruct the number of evolutionary events (structural variants) between each pair, then use unsupervised clustering approaches to group plasmids.

=== RNA plasmids ===
Although most plasmids are double-stranded DNA molecules, some consist of single-stranded DNA, or predominantly double-stranded RNA. RNA plasmids are non-infectious extrachromosomal linear RNA replicons, both encapsidated and unencapsidated, which have been found in fungi and various plants, from algae to land plants. In many cases, however, it may be difficult or impossible to clearly distinguish RNA plasmids from RNA viruses and other infectious RNAs.

=== Chromids ===
Chromids are elements that exist at the boundary between a chromosome and a plasmid, found in about 10% of bacterial species sequenced by 2009. These elements carry core genes and have codon usage similar to the chromosome, yet use a plasmid-type replication mechanism such as the low copy number RepABC. As a result, they have been variously classified as minichromosomes or megaplasmids in the past. In Vibrio, the bacterium synchronizes the replication of the chromosome and chromid by a conserved genome size ratio.

== Vectors ==
Artificially constructed plasmids may be used as vectors in genetic engineering. These plasmids serve as important tools in genetics and biotechnology labs, where they are commonly used to clone and amplify (make many copies of) or express particular genes. A wide variety of plasmids are commercially available for such uses. The gene to be replicated is normally inserted into a plasmid that typically contains a number of features for their use. These include a gene that confers resistance to particular antibiotics (ampicillin is most frequently used for bacterial strains), an origin of replication to allow the bacterial cells to replicate the plasmid DNA, and a suitable site for cloning (referred to as a multiple cloning site).

DNA structural instability can be defined as a series of spontaneous events that culminate in an unforeseen rearrangement, loss, or gain of genetic material. Such events are frequently triggered by the transposition of mobile elements or by the presence of unstable elements such as non-canonical (non-B) structures. Accessory regions pertaining to the bacterial backbone may engage in a wide range of structural instability phenomena. Well-known catalysts of genetic instability include direct, inverted, and tandem repeats, which are known to be conspicuous in a large number of commercially available cloning and expression vectors. Insertion sequences can also severely impact plasmid function and yield, by leading to deletions and rearrangements, activation, down-regulation or inactivation of neighboring gene expression. Therefore, the reduction or complete elimination of extraneous noncoding backbone sequences would pointedly reduce the propensity for such events to take place, and consequently, the overall recombinogenic potential of the plasmid.

A schematic representation of the pBR322 plasmid, one of the first plasmids to be used widely as a cloning vector. Shown on the plasmid diagram are the genes encoded (amp and tet for ampicillin and tetracycline resistance respectively), its origin of replication (ori), and various restriction sites (indicated in blue).

=== Cloning ===
Plasmids are the most-commonly used bacterial cloning vectors. These cloning vectors contain a site that allows DNA fragments to be inserted, for example a multiple cloning site or polylinker which has several commonly used restriction sites to which DNA fragments may be ligated. After the gene of interest is inserted, the plasmids are introduced into bacteria by a process called transformation. These plasmids contain a selectable marker, usually an antibiotic resistance gene, which confers on the bacteria an ability to survive and proliferate in a selective growth medium containing the particular antibiotics. The cells after transformation are exposed to the selective media, and only cells containing the plasmid may survive. In this way, the antibiotics act as a filter to select only the bacteria containing the plasmid DNA. The vector may also contain other marker genes or reporter genes to facilitate selection of plasmids with cloned inserts. Bacteria containing the plasmid can then be grown in large amounts, harvested, and the plasmid of interest may then be isolated using various methods of plasmid preparation.

A plasmid cloning vector is typically used to clone DNA fragments of up to 15 kbp. To clone longer lengths of DNA, lambda phage with lysogeny genes deleted, cosmids, bacterial artificial chromosomes, or yeast artificial chromosomes are used.

=== Suicide Vectors (plasmids) ===
Suicide vectors are plasmids that are unable to replicate in the host cell and therefore have to integrate in the chromosome or disappear. One example of these vectors are pMQ30 plasmid. This plasmid has SacB gene from Bacillus subtilis which can be induced by sucrose and will be lethal when expressed in Gram-negative bacteria. Employing suicide vectors for two-step success monitoring is useful when designing experiments requiring a target gene to be integrated into the chromosome of the bacterial host. In the first step of success monitoring, after transforming the host cells with the plasmid, media treated with the antibiotic the plasmid vector provides resistance to can select for only the bacteria that contain the plasmid. The second step would then allow only the bacteria with plasmids integrated into their chromosomes to survive. Since the pMQ30 plasmid contains the SacB gene that will induce toxicity when expressed in presence of sucrose, only the bacteria that have the plasmid integrated in their chromosomes will survive and reproduce.

=== Protein Production ===
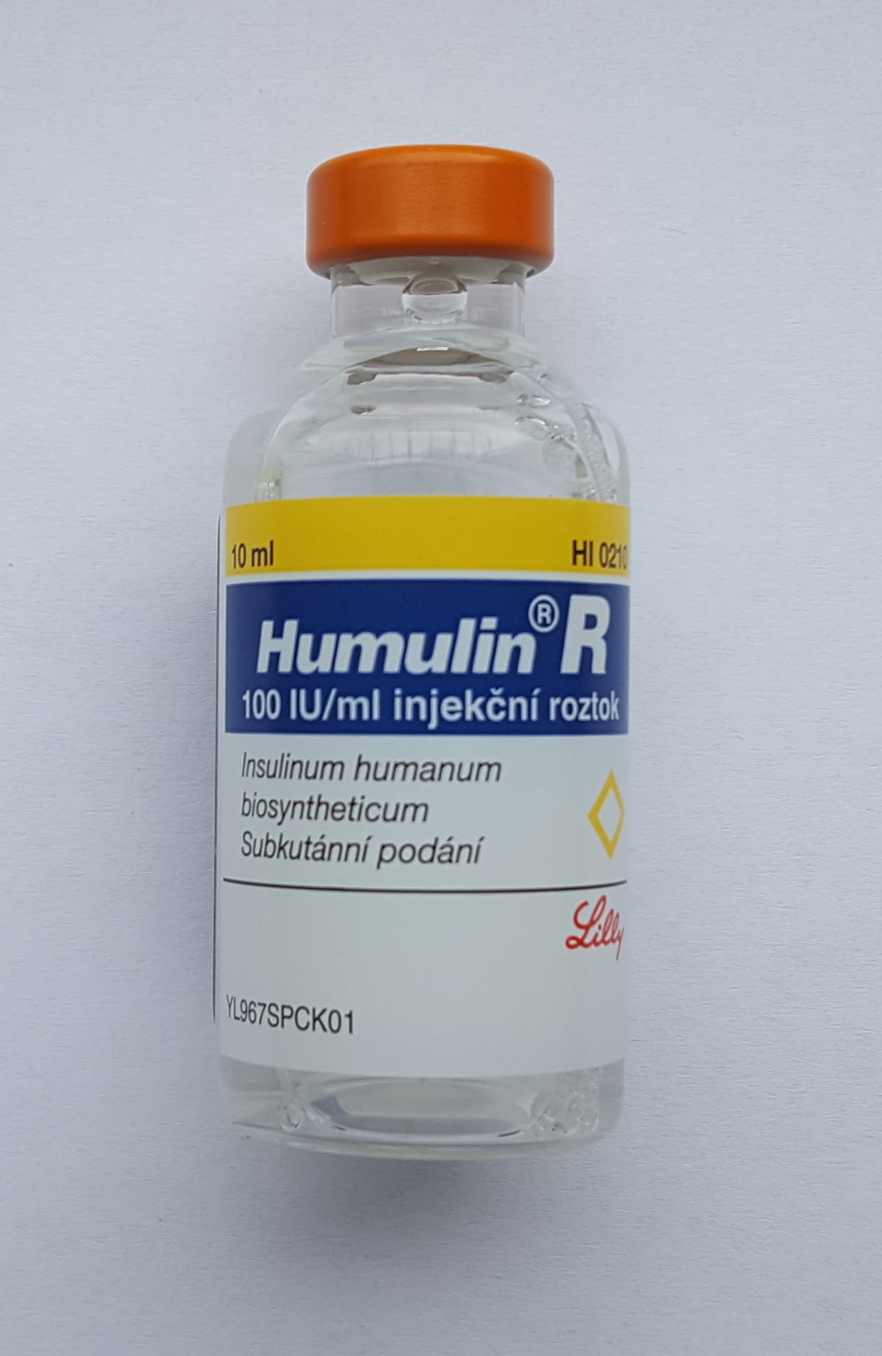
Insulin

Another major use of plasmids is to make large amounts of proteins. In this case, researchers grow bacteria containing a plasmid harboring the gene of interest. Just as the bacterium produces proteins to confer its antibiotic resistance, it can also be induced to produce large amounts of proteins from the inserted gene. This is a cheap and easy way of mass-producing the protein, for example, utilizing the rapid reproduction of E.coli with a plasmid containing the insulin gene leads to a large production of insulin.

=== Gene therapy ===
Plasmids may also be used for gene transfer as a potential treatment in gene therapy so that it may express the protein that is lacking in the cells. Some forms of gene therapy require the insertion of therapeutic genes at pre-selected chromosomal target sites within the human genome. Plasmid vectors are one of many approaches that could be used for this purpose. Zinc finger nucleases (ZFNs) offer a way to cause a site-specific double-strand break to the DNA genome and cause homologous recombination. Plasmids encoding ZFN could help deliver a therapeutic gene to a specific site so that cell damage, cancer-causing mutations, or an immune response is avoided.

=== Disease models ===
Plasmids were historically used to genetically engineer the embryonic stem cells of rats to create rat genetic disease models. The limited efficiency of plasmid-based techniques precluded their use in the creation of more accurate human cell models. However, developments in adeno-associated virus recombination techniques, and zinc finger nucleases, have enabled the creation of a new generation of isogenic human disease models.

=== Biosynthetic Gene Cluster (BGC) ===
Plasmids assist in transporting biosynthetic gene clusters - a set of gene that contain all the necessary enzymes that lead to the production of special metabolites (formally known as secondary metabolite). A benefit of using plasmids to transfer BGC is demonstrated by using a suitable host that can mass produce specialized metabolites, some of these molecules are able to control microbial population. Plasmids can contain and express several BGCs with a few plasmids known to be exclusive for transferring BGCs. BGC's can also be transfers to the host organism's chromosome, utilizing a plasmid vector, which allows for studies in gene knockout experiments. By using plasmids for the uptake of BGCs, microorganisms can gain an advantage as production is not limited to antibiotic resistant biosynthesis genes but the production of toxins/antitoxins.

== Episomes ==
The term episome was introduced by François Jacob and Élie Wollman in 1958 to refer to extra-chromosomal genetic material that may replicate autonomously or become integrated into the chromosome. Since the term was introduced, however, its use has changed, as plasmid has become the preferred term for autonomously replicating extrachromosomal DNA. At a 1968 symposium in London some participants suggested that the term episome be abandoned, although others continued to use the term with a shift in meaning.

Today, some authors use episome in the context of prokaryotes to refer to a plasmid that is capable of integrating into the chromosome. The integrative plasmids may be replicated and stably maintained in a cell through multiple generations, but at some stage, they will exist as an independent plasmid molecule.

In the context of eukaryotes, the term episome is used to mean a non-integrated extrachromosomal closed circular DNA molecule that may be replicated in the nucleus. Viruses are the most common examples of this, such as herpesviruses, adenoviruses, and polyomaviruses, but some are plasmids. Other examples include aberrant chromosomal fragments, such as double minute chromosomes, that can arise during artificial gene amplifications or in pathologic processes (e.g., cancer cell transformation). Episomes in eukaryotes behave similarly to plasmids in prokaryotes in that the DNA is stably maintained and replicated with the host cell. Cytoplasmic viral episomes (as in poxvirus infections) can also occur. Some episomes, such as herpesviruses, replicate in a rolling circle mechanism, similar to bacteriophages (bacterial phage viruses). Others replicate through a bidirectional replication mechanism (Theta type plasmids). In either case, episomes remain physically separate from host cell chromosomes. Several cancer viruses, including Epstein-Barr virus and Kaposi's sarcoma-associated herpesvirus, are maintained as latent, chromosomally distinct episomes in cancer cells, where the viruses express oncogenes that promote cancer cell proliferation. In cancers, these episomes passively replicate together with host chromosomes when the cell divides. When these viral episomes initiate lytic replication to generate multiple virus particles, they generally activate cellular innate immunity defense mechanisms that kill the host cell.

== Plasmid maintenance ==
Some plasmids or microbial hosts include an addiction system or postsegregational killing system (PSK), such as the hok/sok (host killing/suppressor of killing) system of plasmid R1 in Escherichia coli. This variant produces both a long-lived poison and a short-lived antidote. Several types of plasmid addiction systems (toxin/ antitoxin, metabolism-based, ORT systems) were described in the literature and used in biotechnical (fermentation) or biomedical (vaccine therapy) applications. Daughter cells that retain a copy of the plasmid survive, while a daughter cell that fails to inherit the plasmid dies or suffers a reduced growth-rate because of the lingering poison from the parent cell. Finally, the overall productivity could be enhanced.

In contrast, plasmids used in biotechnology, such as pUC18, pBR322 and derived vectors, hardly ever contain toxin-antitoxin addiction systems, and therefore need to be kept under antibiotic pressure to avoid plasmid loss.

== Plasmids in eukaryotes ==
Plasmids replicated and expressed by the eukaryotic cell's machinery may reside in the cytoplasm or the cell nucleus, with different plasmids having different preferences. In addition, eukaryotes have two endosymbiotic organelles with their own genome and genetic machinery – the mitochondrion and the chloroplast – and each of these can carry plasmids in addition to the main organellar genome molecule.

=== Eukaryotic cytoplasmic plasmids ===
==== Yeast cytoplasmic plasmids ====
The natural linear pGKL plasmids from Kluyveromyces lactis are responsible for killer phenotypes. They can be put into the common baker's yeast S. cerevisiae.

=== Eukaryotic nuclear plasmids ===
Plasmids enter the nucleus during cell division, being rolled up in the nuclear envelope as it is reformed. As a result, nuclear plasmids do not work in non-dividing cells.

==== Yeast nuclear plasmids ====
The natural 2 micron plasmid (named after the fact that it is about 2 μm in size) is found in the common baker's yeast S. cerevisiae. It resides in the nucleus in 30–40 copies per cell. It is often modified for genetic engineering of yeast.

Other types of plasmids are often related to yeast cloning vectors that include:

- Yeast integrative plasmid (YIp), yeast vectors that rely on integration into the host chromosome for survival and replication. They are usually modified into cloning vectors when studying the functionality of a solo gene or when the gene is toxic. Also connected with the gene URA3 which codes an enzyme related to the biosynthesis of pyrimidine nucleotides (T, C);
- Yeast replicative plasmid (YRp), which transport a sequence of chromosomal DNA that includes an origin of replication. These plasmids are less stable, as they can be lost during budding.

==== Mammalian nuclear plasmids ====
Artificial plasmids are put into mammalian cells to make them produce a certain gene product. They are also used to identify and quantitatively study regulatory elements, with the assumption that these elements on a plasmid would act similarly to a copy on the chromosome.

==== Interaction with chromatin ====
Being DNA sequences in the nucleus, the plasmid molecule also interactes with histone proteins.

- In yeast, pBR327 produces well-formed chromatin thanks to the alignment of nucleosomes by Histone H5. A specific 800bp region is found to induce this alignment, without which it does not occur.
- Mammals: the HEK 293 cell forms nucleosomes around both intact and damaged pEGFP-N1, but the structure is anomalous compared to proper chromatin from chromosomes. In 2025, it was discovered that formation of chromatin is guided by the sequences of the plasmid (like it is on the chromosome), but only some sequences produce the "native" structure as found on the chromosome.

=== Eukaryotic organellar plasmids ===
==== Natural plant mitochondrial plasmids ====
The mitochondria of many higher plants contain self-replicating, extra-chromosomal linear or circular DNA molecules which have been considered to be plasmids. These can range from 0.7 kb to 20 kb in size. The plasmids have been generally classified into two categories- circular and linear. Circular plasmids have been isolated and found in many different plants, with those in Vicia faba and Chenopodium album being the most studied and whose mechanism of replication is known. The circular plasmids can replicate using the θ model of replication (as in Vicia faba) and through rolling circle replication (as in C.album). Linear plasmids have been identified in some plant species such as Beta vulgaris, Brassica napus, Zea mays, etc. but are rarer than their circular counterparts.

The function and origin of these plasmids remains largely unknown. It has been suggested that the circular plasmids share a common ancestor, some genes in the mitochondrial plasmid have counterparts in the nuclear DNA suggesting inter-compartment exchange. Meanwhile, the linear plasmids share structural similarities such as invertrons with viral DNA and fungal plasmids, like fungal plasmids they also have low GC content, these observations have led to some hypothesizing that these linear plasmids have viral origins, or have ended up in plant mitochondria through horizontal gene transfer from pathogenic fungi.

== Study of plasmids ==
=== Plasmid DNA extraction ===
Plasmids are often used to purify a specific sequence, since they can easily be purified away from the rest of the genome. For their use as vectors, and for molecular cloning, plasmids often need to be isolated.

There are several methods to isolate plasmid DNA from bacteria, ranging from the plasmid extraction kits (miniprep to the maxiprep or bulkprep), alkaline lysis, enzymatic lysis, and mechanical lysis . The former can be used to quickly find out whether the plasmid is correct in any of several bacterial clones. The yield is a small amount of impure plasmid DNA, which is sufficient for analysis by restriction digest and for some cloning techniques.

In the latter, much larger volumes of bacterial suspension are grown from which a maxi-prep can be performed. In essence, this is a scaled-up miniprep followed by additional purification. This results in relatively large amounts (several hundred micrograms) of very pure plasmid DNA.

Many commercial kits have been created to perform plasmid extraction at various scales, purity, and levels of automation.

=== Conformations ===
Plasmid DNA may appear in one of five conformations, which (for a given size) run at different speeds in a gel during electrophoresis. The conformations are listed below in order of electrophoretic mobility (speed for a given applied voltage) from slowest to fastest:

- Nicked open-circular DNA has one strand cut.
- Relaxed circular DNA is fully intact with both strands uncut but has been enzymatically relaxed (supercoils removed). This can be modeled by letting a twisted extension cord unwind and relax and then plugging it into itself.
- Linear DNA has free ends, either because both strands have been cut or because the DNA was linear in vivo. This can be modeled with an electrical extension cord that is not plugged into itself.
- Supercoiled (or covalently closed-circular) DNA is fully intact with both strands uncut, and with an integral twist, resulting in a compact form. This can be modeled by twisting an extension cord and then plugging it into itself.
- Supercoiled denatured DNA is similar to supercoiled DNA, but has unpaired regions that make it slightly less compact; this can result from excessive alkalinity during plasmid preparation.

The rate of migration for small linear fragments is directly proportional to the voltage applied at low voltages. At higher voltages, larger fragments migrate at continuously increasing yet different rates. Thus, the resolution of a gel decreases with increased voltage.

At a specified, low voltage, the migration rate of small linear DNA fragments is a function of their length. Large linear fragments (over 20 kb or so) migrate at a certain fixed rate regardless of length. This is because the molecules 'respirate', with the bulk of the molecule following the leading end through the gel matrix. Restriction digests are frequently used to analyse purified plasmids. These enzymes specifically break the DNA at certain short sequences. The resulting linear fragments form 'bands' after gel electrophoresis. It is possible to purify certain fragments by cutting the bands out of the gel and dissolving the gel to release the DNA fragments.

Because of its tight conformation, supercoiled DNA migrates faster through a gel than linear or open-circular DNA.

=== Software for bioinformatics and design ===
The use of plasmids as a technique in molecular biology is supported by bioinformatics software. These programs record the DNA sequence of plasmid vectors, help to predict cut sites of restriction enzymes, and to plan manipulations. Examples of software packages that handle plasmid maps are ApE, Clone Manager, GeneConstructionKit, Geneious, Genome Compiler, LabGenius, Lasergene, MacVector, pDraw32, Serial Cloner, UGENE, VectorFriends, Vector NTI, and WebDSV. These pieces of software help conduct entire experiments in silico before doing wet experiments.

=== Plasmid collections ===
Many plasmids have been created over the years and researchers have given out plasmids to plasmid databases such as the non-profit organisations Addgene and BCCM/GeneCorner. One can find and request plasmids from those databases for research. Researchers also often upload plasmid sequences to the NCBI database, from which sequences of specific plasmids can be retrieved. There have been multiple efforts to create curated and quality controlled databases from these uploaded sequences; an early example is by Orlek et al, which limited itself to Enterobacteriaceae plasmids, while COMPASS also encompassed plasmids from other bacteria. More recently, PLSDB was made as a more up to date curated database of NCBI plasmids, and as of 2024 contains over 72,000 entries. A similar database is pATLAS, which additionally includes visual analytics tools to show relationships between plasmids. The largest plasmid database made from publicly available data is IMG/PR, which not only contains full plasmid sequences retrieved from NCBI, but novel plasmid genomes found from metagenomes and metatranscriptomes.

Other datasets have been created by sequencing and computing plasmid genomes from pre-existing bacterial collections, e.g. the NORM collection and the Murray Collection.

In addition to academic and non-profit repositories, plasmid DNA is also produced at industrial scale by specialized biotechnology companies supporting gene therapy and biopharmaceutical development, including Aldevron, Cobra Biologics and 3PBIOVIAN.

== See also ==
- Bacterial artificial chromosome
- Bacteriophage
- DNA recombination
- Plasmidome
- Provirus
- Secondary chromosome
- Segrosome
- Transposon
- Triparental mating
- VectorDB
