= Cloning vector =

Small piece of maintainable DNA

Schematic representation of the pBR322 plasmid, one of the first plasmids widely used as a cloning vector.

A cloning vector is a small piece of DNA that can be stably maintained in an organism, and into which a foreign DNA fragment can be inserted for cloning purposes. The cloning vector may be DNA taken from a virus, the cell of a higher organism, or it may be the plasmid of a bacterium. The vector contains features that allow for the convenient insertion of a DNA fragment into the vector or its removal from the vector, for example through the presence of restriction sites. The vector and the foreign DNA may be treated with a restriction enzyme that cuts the DNA, and DNA fragments thus generated contain either blunt ends or overhangs known as sticky ends, and vector DNA and foreign DNA with compatible ends can then be joined by molecular ligation. After a DNA fragment has been cloned into a cloning vector, it may be further subcloned into another vector designed for more specific use.

There are many types of cloning vectors, but the most commonly used ones are genetically engineered plasmids. Cloning is generally first performed using Escherichia coli, and cloning vectors in E. coli include plasmids, bacteriophages (such as phage λ), cosmids, and bacterial artificial chromosomes (BACs). Some DNA, however, cannot be stably maintained in E. coli, for example very large DNA fragments, and other organisms such as yeast may be used. Cloning vectors in yeast include yeast artificial chromosomes (YACs).

== Features of a cloning vector ==
All commonly used cloning vectors in molecular biology have key features necessary for their function, such as a suitable cloning site and selectable marker. Others may have additional features specific to their use. For reason of ease and convenience, cloning is often performed using E. coli. Thus, the cloning vectors used often have elements necessary for their propagation and maintenance in E. coli, such as a functional origin of replication (ori). The ColE1 origin of replication is found in many plasmids. Some vectors also include elements that allow them to be maintained in another organism in addition to E. coli, and these vectors are called shuttle vector.

=== Cloning site ===
All cloning vectors have features that allow a gene to be conveniently inserted into the vector or removed from it. This may be a multiple cloning site (MCS) or polylinker, which contains many unique restriction sites. The restriction sites in the MCS are first cleaved by restriction enzymes, then a PCR-amplified target gene also digested with the same enzymes is ligated into the vectors using DNA ligase. The target DNA sequence can be inserted into the vector in a specific direction if so desired. The restriction sites may be further used for sub-cloning into another vector if necessary.

Other cloning vectors may use topoisomerase instead of ligase and cloning may be done more rapidly without the need for restriction digest of the vector or insert. In this TOPO cloning method a linearized vector is activated by attaching topoisomerase I to its ends, and this "TOPO-activated" vector may then accept a PCR product by ligating both the 5' ends of the PCR product, releasing the topoisomerase and forming a circular vector in the process. Another method of cloning without the use of DNA digest and ligase is by DNA recombination, for example as used in the Gateway cloning system, and Gibson assembly. The gene, once cloned into the cloning vector (called entry clone in this method), may be conveniently introduced into a variety of expression vectors by recombination.

=== Selectable marker ===
A selectable marker is carried by the vector to allow the selection of positively transformed cells. Antibiotic resistance is often used as marker, an example being the beta-lactamase gene, which confers resistance to the penicillin group of beta-lactam antibiotics like ampicillin or other classes of antibiotics, such as Tetracycline, Kanamycin A, or Chloramphenicol. Some vectors contain two selectable markers, for example the plasmid pACYC177 has both ampicillin and kanamycin resistance gene. Shuttle vector which is designed to be maintained in two different organisms may also require two selectable markers, although some selectable markers such as resistance to zeocin and hygromycin B are effective in different cell types. Auxotrophic selection markers that allow an auxotrophic organism to grow in minimal growth medium may also be used; examples of these are LEU2 and URA3 which are used with their corresponding auxotrophic strains of yeast.

Another kind of selectable marker allows for the positive selection of plasmid with cloned gene. This may involve the use of a gene lethal to the host cells, such as barnase, Ccda, and the parD/parE toxins. This typically works by disrupting or removing the lethal gene during the cloning process, and unsuccessful clones where the lethal gene still remains intact would kill the host cells, therefore only successful clones are selected.

=== Reporter gene ===
Reporter genes are used in some cloning vectors to facilitate the screening of successful clones by using features of these genes that allow successful clone to be easily identified. Such features present in cloning vectors may be the lacZα fragment for α complementation in blue-white selection, and/or marker gene or reporter genes in frame with and flanking the MCS to facilitate the production of fusion proteins. Examples of fusion partners that may be used for screening are the green fluorescent protein (GFP) and luciferase.

=== Elements for expression ===
A cloning vector need not contain suitable elements for the expression of a cloned target gene, such as a promoter and ribosomal binding site (RBS), many however do, and may then work as an expression vector. The target DNA may be inserted into a site that is under the control of a particular promoter necessary for the expression of the target gene in the chosen host. Where the promoter is present, the expression of the gene is preferably tightly controlled and inducible so that proteins are only produced when required. Some commonly used promoters are the T7 and lac promoters. The presence of a promoter is necessary when screening techniques such as blue-white selection are used.

Cloning vectors without promoter and RBS for the cloned DNA sequence are sometimes used, for example when cloning genes whose products are toxic to E. coli cells. Promoter and RBS for the cloned DNA sequence are also unnecessary when first making a genomic or cDNA library of clones since the cloned genes are normally subcloned into a more appropriate expression vector if their expression is required.

Some vectors are designed for transcription only with no heterologous protein expressed, for example for in vitro mRNA production. These vectors are called transcription vectors. They may lack the sequences necessary for polyadenylation and termination, therefore may not be used for protein production.

== Types of cloning vectors ==
A large number of cloning vectors are available, and choosing the vector may depend upon a number of factors, such as the size of the insert, copy number and cloning method. Large insert may not be stably maintained in a general cloning vector, especially for those with a high copy number, therefore cloning large fragments may require more specialised cloning vector.

The pUC plasmid has a high copy number, contains a multiple cloning site (polylinker), a gene for ampicillin antibiotic selection, and can be used for blue-white screen.

=== Plasmid ===
Plasmids are autonomously replicating circular extra-chromosomal DNA. They are the standard cloning vectors and the ones most commonly used. Most general plasmids may be used to clone DNA inserts of up to 15 kb in size. One of the earliest commonly used cloning vectors is the pBR322 plasmid. Other cloning vectors include the pUC series of plasmids, and a large number of different cloning plasmid vectors are available. Many plasmids have high copy numbers, for example, pUC19 has a copy number of 500-700 copies per cell, and high copy number is useful as it produces greater yield of recombinant plasmid for subsequent manipulation. However low-copy-number plasmids may be preferably used in certain circumstances, for example, when the protein from the cloned gene is toxic to the cells.

Some plasmids contain an M13 bacteriophage origin of replication and may be used to generate single-stranded DNA. These are called phagemids, and examples are the pBluescript series of cloning vectors.

Because plasmid-based cloning vectors have been widely adopted in molecular biology, well-characterized examples are maintained as reference materials in public biological resource centres and non-profit repositories, supporting reproducibility in research; such repositories include Addgene and public collections such as BCCM/GeneCorner.

=== Bacteriophage ===
The bacteriophages used for cloning are the λ phage and M13 phage. There is an upper limit on the amount of DNA that can be packed into a phage (a maximum of 53 kb), therefore to allow foreign DNA to be inserted into phage DNA, phage cloning vectors may need to have some non-essential genes deleted, for example the genes for lysogeny since using phage λ as a cloning vector involves only the lytic cycle. There are two kinds of λ phage vectors - insertion vector and replacement vector. Insertion vectors contain a unique cleavage site whereby foreign DNA with size of 5–11 kb may be inserted. In replacement vectors, the cleavage sites flank a region containing genes not essential for the lytic cycle, and this region may be deleted and replaced by the DNA insert in the cloning process, and a larger sized DNA of 8–24 kb may be inserted.

There is also a lower size limit for DNA that can be packed into a phage, and vector DNA that is too small cannot be properly packaged into the phage. This property can be used for selection - vector without insert may be too small, therefore only vectors with insert may be selected for propagation.

=== Cosmid ===
Cosmids are plasmids that incorporate a segment of bacteriophage λ DNA that has the cohesive end site (cos) which contains elements required for packaging DNA into λ particles. Under apt origin of replication (ori), it can replicate as a plasmid. It is normally used to clone large DNA fragments between 28 and 45 Kb.

=== Bacterial artificial chromosome ===
Insert size of up to 350 kb can be cloned in bacterial artificial chromosome (BAC). BACs are maintained in E. coli with a copy number of only 1 per cell. BACs are based on F plasmid, another artificial chromosome called the PAC is based on the P1 phage.

=== Yeast artificial chromosome ===
Yeast artificial chromosome are used as vectors to clone DNA fragments of more than 1 mega base (1Mb=1000kb) in size. They are useful in cloning larger DNA fragments as required in mapping genomes such as in the Human Genome Project. It contains a telomeric sequence, an autonomously replicating sequence (features required to replicate linear chromosomes in yeast cells). These vectors also contain suitable restriction sites to clone foreign DNA as well as genes to be used as selectable markers.

=== Human artificial chromosome ===
Human artificial chromosome may be potentially useful as a gene transfer vectors for gene delivery into human cells, and a tool for expression studies and determining human chromosome function. It can carry very large DNA fragment (there is no upper limit on size for practical purposes), therefore it does not have the problem of limited cloning capacity of other vectors, and it also avoids possible insertional mutagenesis caused by integration into host chromosomes by viral vector.

=== Animal and plant viral vectors ===
Viruses that infect plant and animal cells have also been manipulated to introduce foreign genes into plant and animal cells. The natural ability of viruses to adsorb to cells, introduce their DNA and replicate have made them ideal vehicles to transfer foreign DNA into eukaryotic cells in culture. A vector based on Simian virus 40 (SV40) was used in first cloning experiment involving mammalian cells. A number of vectors based on other type of viruses like Adenoviruses and Papilloma virus have been used to clone genes in mammals. At present, retroviral vectors are popular for cloning genes in mammalian cells. In case of plants like Cauliflower mosaic virus, Tobacco mosaic virus and Gemini viruses have been used with limited success.

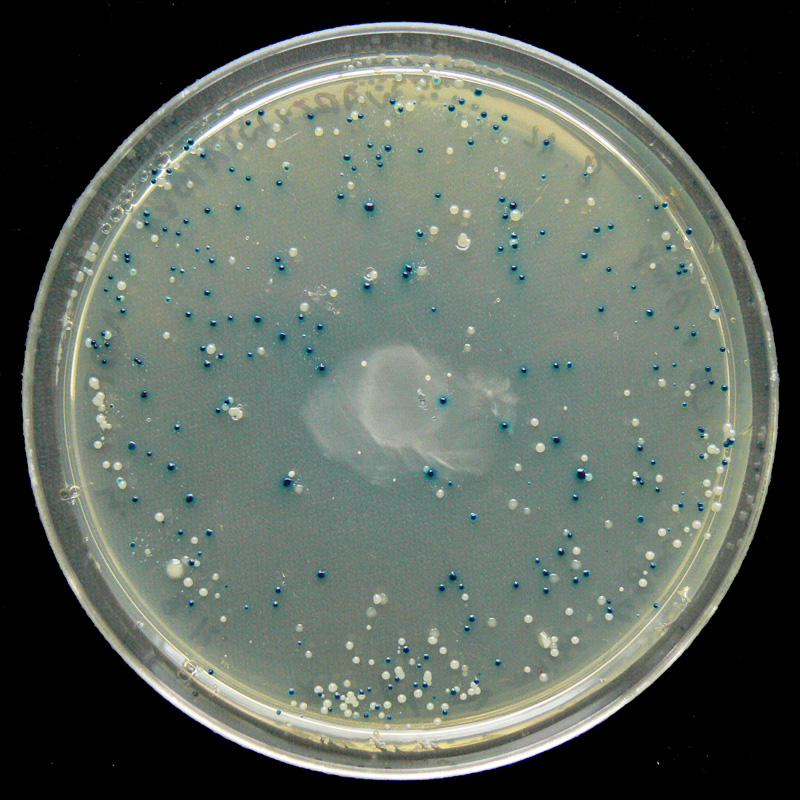
An LB agar plate showing the result of a blue white screen. White colonies may contain an insert in the plasmid it carries, while the blue ones are unsuccessful clones.

== Screening: example of the blue/white screen ==
Many general purpose vectors such as pUC19 usually include a system for detecting the presence of a cloned DNA fragment, based on the loss of an easily scored phenotype. The most widely used is the gene coding for E. coli β-galactosidase, whose activity can easily be detected by the ability of the enzyme it encodes to hydrolyze the soluble, colourless substrate X-gal (5-bromo-4-chloro-3-indolyl-beta-d-galactoside) into an insoluble, blue product (5,5'-dibromo-4,4'-dichloro indigo). Cloning a fragment of DNA within the vector-based lacZα sequence of the β-galactosidase prevents the production of an active enzyme. If X-gal is included in the selective agar plates, transformant colonies are generally blue in the case of a vector with no inserted DNA and white in the case of a vector containing a fragment of cloned DNA.

== See also ==
- Vector (molecular biology)
- Plant transformation vector
- IMAGE cDNA clones
- fosmid
- Golden Gate Cloning
