= German Resource Center for Genome Research =

Research center in Germany

- Type: service center
- Headquarters: Berlin-Charlottenburg; Heidelberg
- Area served: Germany; London
- Services: genomic cell clones and cDNA databases; cell cultures; microarrays; expression profiles; affymetrix services; PCR offers

The German Resource Center for Genome Research (RZPD, Resourcenzentrum Primärdatenbank) was a service center for gene and genome research in Berlin-Charlottenburg and Heidelberg.

== History ==
In 1987 Hans Lehrach and Günther Zehetner founded the Reference Library / Primary Database (RLDB) at the Imperial Cancer Research Fund (ICRF) in London. The RLDB distributed macroarrays generated at the ICRF to research groups worldwide. The macroarrays consisted of clones of genomic and cDNA libraries transferred to 22 × 22 cm nylon filters with the help of robots which have been developed by Zehetner at the ICRF. The first-generation machines achieved a 1/100 mm resolution employing two-phase stepper motors in a half-step modus with 400 steps per rotation. These robots achieved spotting densities of more than 400 dots per square centimeter having been programmed for a spatial resolution of 0.015 mm over a moving length of 600 mm. A second generation of robots engineered from 1991 to 1992 achieved already a spotting density of up to 2500 dots per square centimeter utilizing linear motors. Experimental results done with the standardized materials were reported back by researchers and collected in the Primary Database. In January 1990 Zehetner was appointed as Associated Scientist at the ICRF under the then Director General Sir Walter Bodmer.

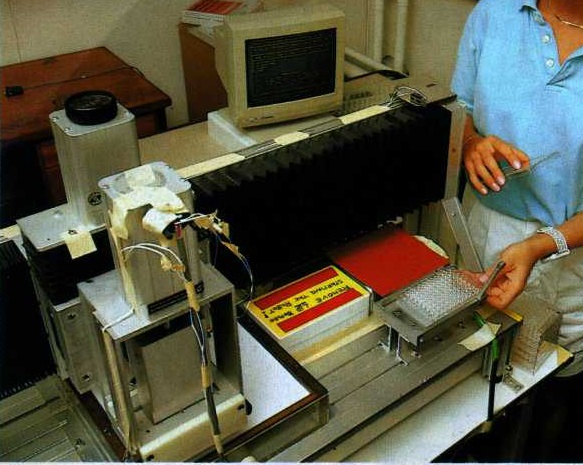
Early version of a spotting robot developed at the ICRF to generate macroarray filter membranes from clones in microtiter plates.

In early 1995 the RLDB moved to Berlin to the Max Planck Institute for Molecular Genetics, where it continued its work.

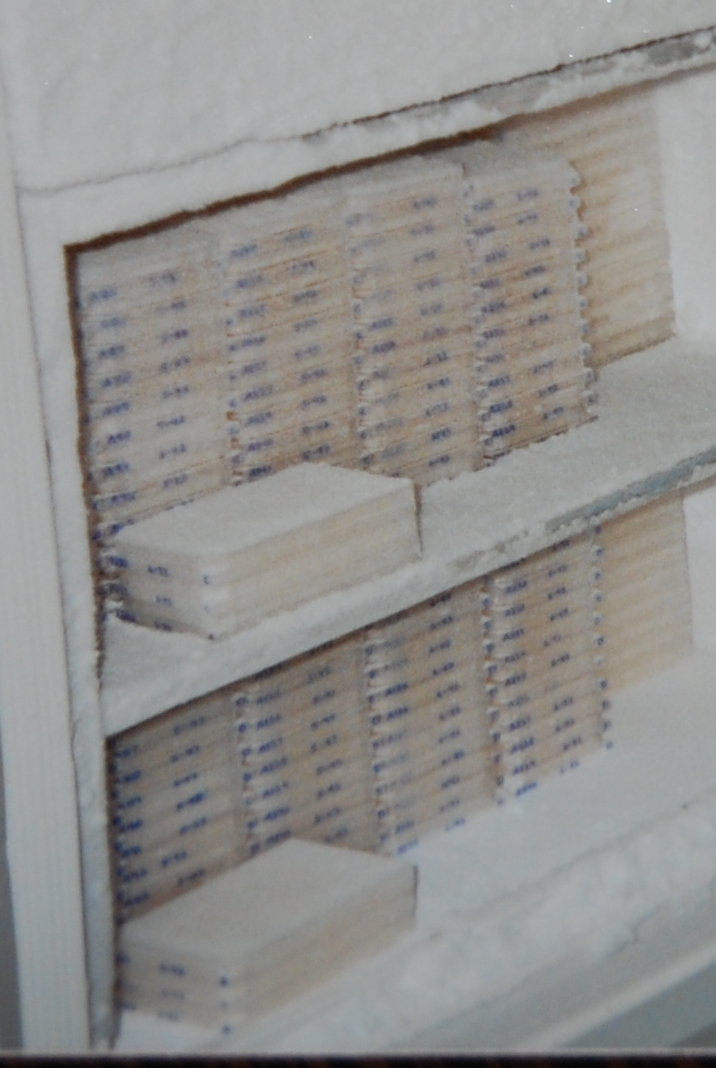
Frozen microtiter plates with library clones

In the summer of 1995, the Resource Centre was established as part of the German Human Genome Project (DHGP) by Hans Lehrach (Max Planck Institute for Molecular Genetics (MPIMG), Berlin-Dahlem), Günther Zehetner (MPIMG, until July 2000 Scientific Director of the Berlin Resource Center) and Annemarie Poustka (German Cancer Research Center (DKFZ), Heidelberg). As Resource Center/Primary Database (RZPD) it took over the work of the RLDB. It was funded by the Federal Ministry of Education and Research (BMBF) in order to provide the materials free of charge to the members of the DHGP, while they were available to other researchers at cost prize. The RZPD became the largest database for genetic clones worldwide and was associated with many of the major national and international gene and genome research projects. The RZPD was one of only two distributors in Europe for IMAGE cDNA clones and also constructed its own plasmid, cosmid, YAC and cDNA libraries. Each clone was stored in a well of a 96 or 384 well microtiter plate, which were kept, while not used for spotting, in deep freezers at -80 °C.

On 1 July 2000 the RZPD was converted into a Non-Profit-Gesellschaft mit beschränkter Haftung (gGmbH). This company with limited liability was supported by three of the most important research companies in Germany: the Max Planck Society, the German Cancer Research Center and the Max Delbrück Center for Molecular Medicine (MDC Berlin-Buch). As scientific company members served Hans Lehrach (MPIMG), Annemarie Poustka (DKFZ), Jens Reich (MDC) Matthias Uhlen (Karolinska Institute, Stockholm) and Harald zur Hausen (DKFZ).

On 31 July 2007 the non-profit company was disbanded. A large part of the existing services was taken over by two new companies. ImaGenes (a start-up company by the former managing directors of the RZPD) and ATLAS Biolabs GmbH, which was co-founded by Lehrach with the former department heads of the RZPD, Uwe Radelof und Bernd Drescher.

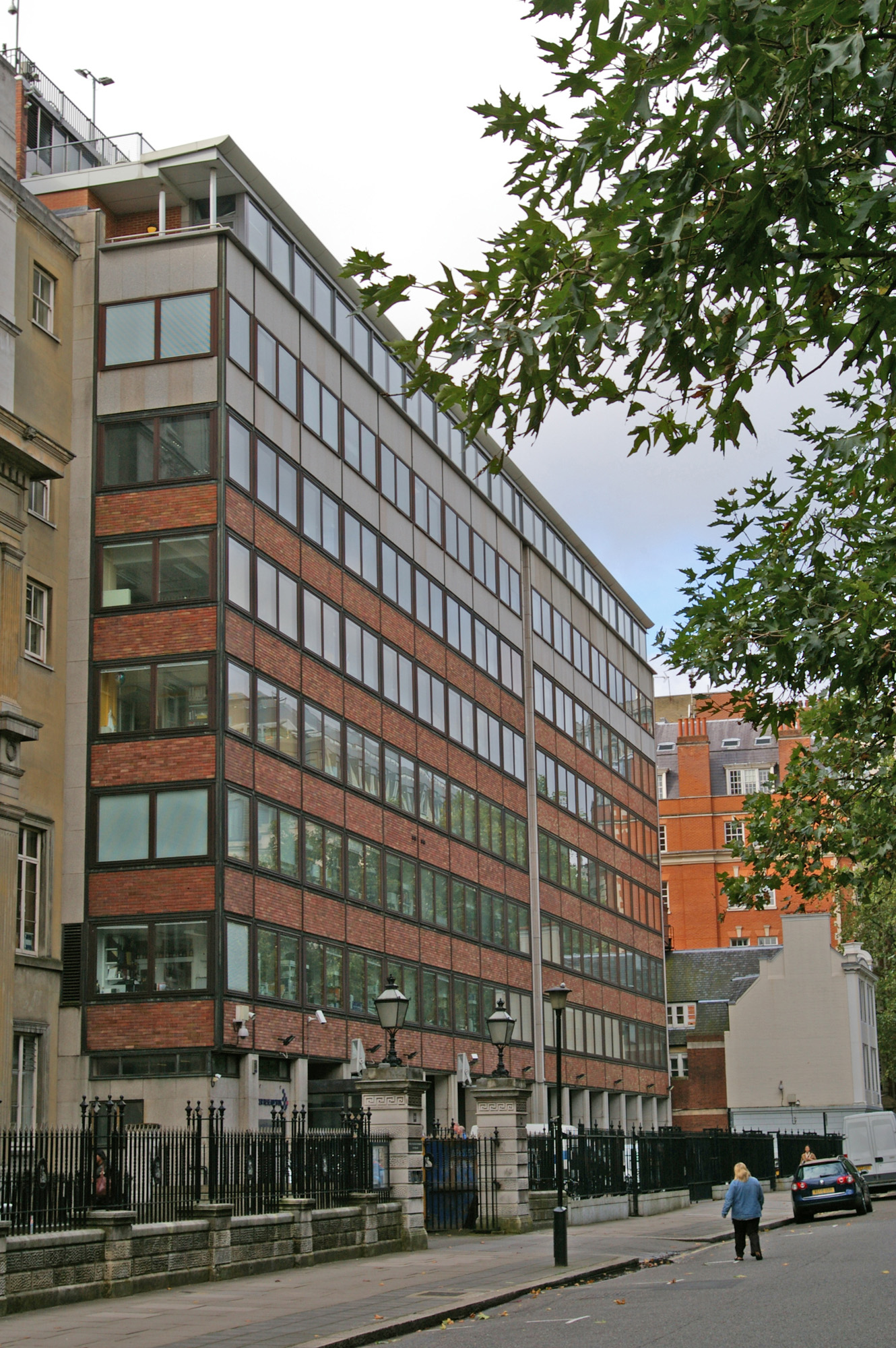
Main building of the former ICRF in 2008 after it became the London Research Institute

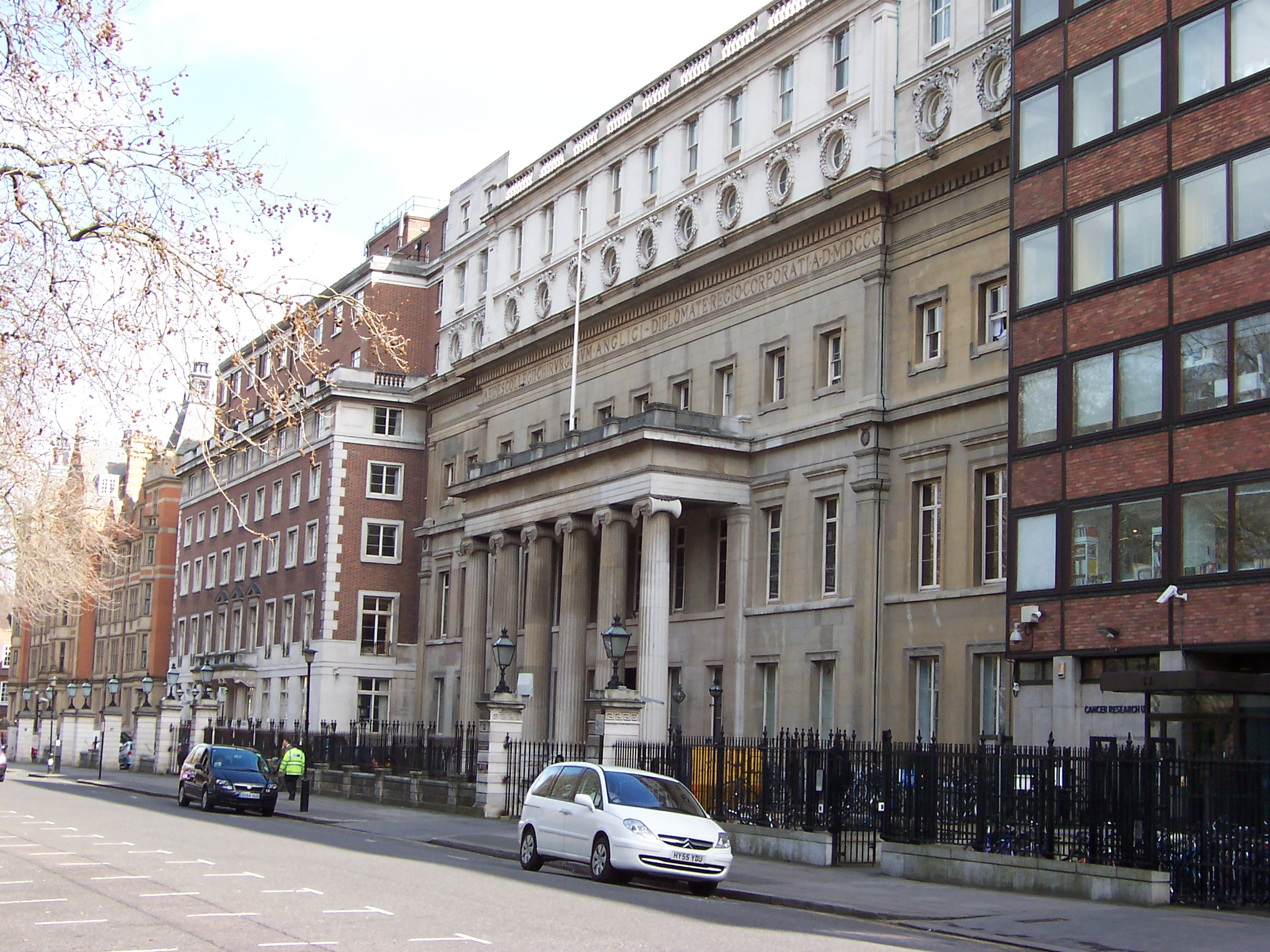
Royal College of Surgeons (centre) and Imperial Cancer Research Fund (right), London

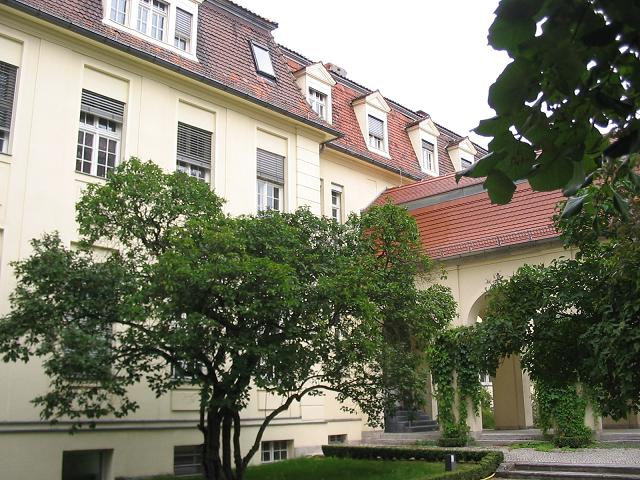
Neo-baroque institute building in Berlin

== Services ==
The scope of services was constantly expanded and included the provision of genomic cell clones and cDNA databases, cell cultures, microarrays, expression profiles, Affymetrix services and PCR offers. Data collected in the Primary Database were made available to compare experimental results by researches using the globally standardized material provided by the center.

== Locations ==
The RLDB office in London was located in the main ICRF building at Lincoln's Inn Fields, Holborn and later moved to bigger premises in the adjacent Royal College of Surgeons building. The Lincoln's Inn Fields building was later sold to the London School of Economics and demolished in 2018 to make way for their new Marshall Building.

In Berlin the RZPD was first located at the Max Planck Institute for Molecular Genetics in Berlin-Dahlem and then moved to a nearby site at the Harnack road (which today is the site of the Max Planck Institute for the History of Science) before the center relocated to its final location at the former building of the Empress Auguste Viktoria Infant Home in Heubnerweg in Berlin-Charlottenburg. The Neo-baroque building was constructed in the years 1907–1909 under the leadership of architect and Berlin City Commissioner for City Planning Ludwig Hoffmann established, while the planning was significantly influenced by the architect Alfred Messel. The small Heidelberg component of the center was located within the DKFZ.
