= Gene delivery =

Introduction of foreign genetic material into host cells

Gene delivery is the process of introducing foreign genetic material, such as DNA or RNA, into host cells. Gene delivery must reach the genome of the host cell to induce gene expression. Successful gene delivery requires the foreign gene delivery to remain stable within the host cell and can either integrate into the genome or replicate independently of it. This requires foreign DNA to be synthesized as part of a vector, which is designed to enter the desired host cell and deliver the transgene to that cell's genome. Vectors utilized as the method for gene delivery can be divided into two categories, recombinant viruses and synthetic vectors (viral and non-viral).

In complex multicellular eukaryotes (more specifically Weissmanists), if the transgene is incorporated into the host's germline cells, the resulting host cell can pass the transgene to its progeny. If the transgene is incorporated into somatic cells, the transgene will stay with the somatic cell line, and thus its host organism.

Gene delivery is a necessary step in gene therapy for the introduction or silencing of a gene to promote a therapeutic outcome in patients and also has applications in the genetic modification of crops. There are many different methods of gene delivery for various types of cells and tissues.

== History ==
Viral based vectors emerged in the 1980s as a tool for transgene expression. In 1983, Albert Siegel described the use of viral vectors in plant transgene expression although viral manipulation via cDNA cloning was not yet available. The first virus to be used as a vaccine vector was the vaccinia virus in 1984 as a way to protect chimpanzees against hepatitis B. Non-viral gene delivery was first reported on in 1943 by Avery et al. who showed cellular phenotype change via exogenous DNA exposure.

== Methods ==
Bacterial transformation involves moving a gene from one bacteria to another. It is integrated into the recipients plasmid. and can then be expressed by the new host.

There are a variety of methods available to deliver genes to host cells. When genes are delivered to bacteria or plants the process is called transformation and when it is used to deliver genes to animals it is called transfection. This is because transformation has a different meaning in relation to animals, indicating progression to a cancerous state. For some bacteria no external methods are need to introduce genes as they are naturally able to take up foreign DNA. Most cells require some sort of intervention to make the cell membrane permeable to DNA and allow the DNA to be stably inserted into the hosts genome.

=== Chemical ===
Chemical based methods of gene delivery can use natural or synthetic compounds to form particles that facilitate the transfer of genes into cells. These synthetic vectors have the ability to electrostatically bind DNA or RNA and compact the genetic information to accommodate larger genetic transfers. Chemical vectors usually enter cells by endocytosis and can protect genetic material from degradation.

==== Heat shock ====
One of the simplest method involves altering the environment of the cell and then stressing it by giving it a heat shock. Typically the cells are incubated in a solution containing divalent cations (often calcium chloride) under cold conditions, before being exposed to a heat pulse. Calcium chloride partially disrupts the cell membrane, which allows the recombinant DNA to enter the host cell. It is suggested that exposing the cells to divalent cations in cold condition may change or weaken the cell surface structure, making it more permeable to DNA. The heat-pulse is thought to create a thermal imbalance across the cell membrane, which forces the DNA to enter the cells through either cell pores or the damaged cell wall.

==== Calcium phosphate ====
Another simple methods involves using calcium phosphate to bind the DNA and then exposing it to cultured cells. The solution, along with the DNA, is encapsulated by the cells and a small amount of DNA can be integrated into the genome.

==== Liposomes and polymers ====
Liposomes and polymers can be used as vectors to deliver DNA into cells. Positively charged liposomes bind with the negatively charged DNA, while polymers can be designed that interact with DNA. They form lipoplexes and polyplexes respectively, which are then up-taken by the cells. The two systems can also be combined. Polymer-based non-viral vectors uses polymers to interact with DNA and form polyplexes.

==== Nanoparticles ====
The use of engineered inorganic and organic nanoparticles is another non-viral approach for gene delivery.

=== Physical ===
Artificial gene delivery can be mediated by physical methods which uses force to introduce genetic material through the cell membrane.

==== Electroporation ====
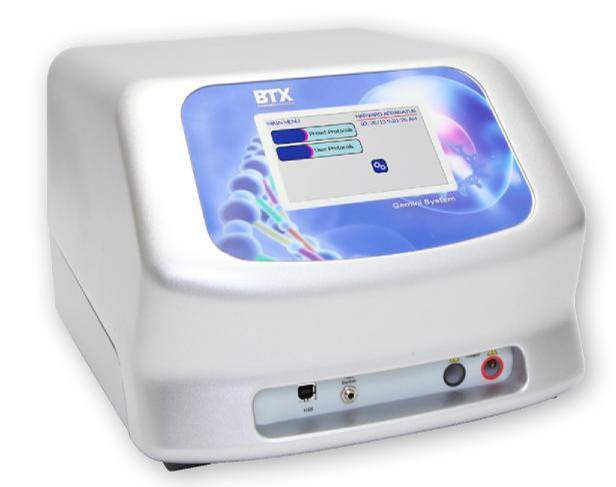
Electroporators can be used to make the cell membrane permeable to DNA

Electroporation is a method of promoting competence. Cells are briefly shocked with an electric field of 10-20 kV/cm, which is thought to create holes in the cell membrane through which the plasmid DNA may enter. After the electric shock, the holes are rapidly closed by the cell's membrane-repair mechanisms.

==== Biolistics ====
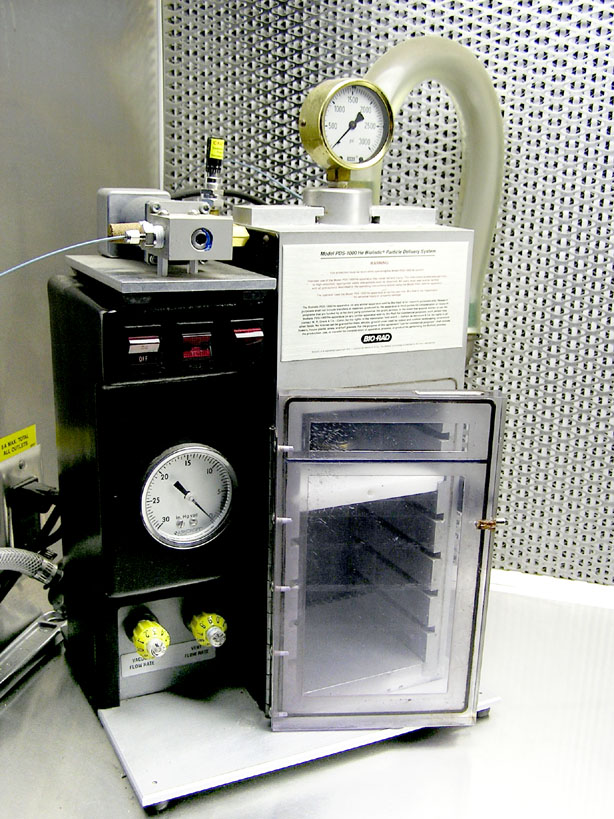
A gene gun uses biolistics to insert DNA into cells

Another method used to transform plant cells is biolistics, where particles of gold or tungsten are coated with DNA and then shot into young plant cells or plant embryos. Some genetic material enters the cells and transforms them. This method can be used on plants that are not susceptible to Agrobacterium infection and also allows transformation of plant plastids. Plants cells can also be transformed using electroporation, which uses an electric shock to make the cell membrane permeable to plasmid DNA. Due to the damage caused to the cells and DNA the transformation efficiency of biolistics and electroporation is lower than agrobacterial transformation.

==== Microinjection ====
Microinjection is where DNA is injected through the cell's nuclear envelope directly into the nucleus.

==== Sonoporation ====
Sonoporation is the transient permeation of cell membranes assisted by ultrasound, typically in the presence of gas microbubbles. Sonoporation allows for the entry of genetic material into cells.

==== Photoporation ====
Photoporation is when laser pulses are used to create pores in a cell membrane to allow entry of genetic material.

==== Magnetofection ====
Magnetofection uses magnetic particles complexed with DNA and an external magnetic field concentrate nucleic acid particles into target cells.

==== Hydroporation ====
A hydrodynamic capillary effect can be used to manipulate cell permeability.

=== Agrobacterium ===
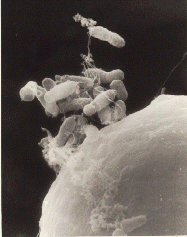
A. tumefaciens attaching itself to a carrot cell

In plants the DNA is often inserted using Agrobacterium-mediated recombination, taking advantage of the Agrobacteriums T-DNA sequence that allows natural insertion of genetic material into plant cells. Plant tissue are cut into small pieces and soaked in a fluid containing suspended Agrobacterium. The bacteria will attach to many of the plant cells exposed by the cuts. The bacteria uses conjugation to transfer a DNA segment called T-DNA from its plasmid into the plant. The transferred DNA is piloted to the plant cell nucleus and integrated into the host plants genomic DNA.The plasmid T-DNA is integrated semi-randomly into the genome of the host cell.

By modifying the plasmid to express the gene of interest, researchers can insert their chosen gene stably into the plants genome. The only essential parts of the T-DNA are its two small (25 base pair) border repeats, at least one of which is needed for plant transformation. The genes to be introduced into the plant are cloned into a plant transformation vector that contains the T-DNA region of the plasmid. An alternative method is agroinfiltration.

=== Viral delivery ===
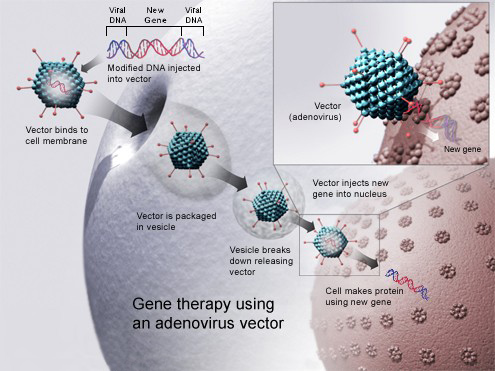
Foreign DNA being transduced into the host cell through an adenovirus vector.

Virus mediated gene delivery utilizes the ability of a virus to inject its DNA inside a host cell and takes advantage of the virus' own ability to replicate and implement their own genetic material. Viral methods of gene delivery are more likely to induce an immune response, but they have high efficiency. Transduction is the process that describes virus-mediated insertion of DNA into the host cell. Viruses are a particularly effective form of gene delivery because the structure of the virus prevents degradation via lysosomes of the DNA it is delivering to the nucleus of the host cell. In gene therapy a gene that is intended for delivery is packaged into a replication-deficient viral particle to form a viral vector. Viruses used for gene therapy to date include retrovirus, adenovirus, adeno-associated virus and herpes simplex virus. However, there are drawbacks to using viruses to deliver genes into cells. Viruses can only deliver very small pieces of DNA into the cells, it is labor-intensive and there are risks of random insertion sites, cytopathic effects and mutagenesis.

Viral vector based gene delivery uses a viral vector to deliver genetic material to the host cell. This is done by using a virus that contains the desired gene and removing the part of the viruses genome that is infectious. Viruses are efficient at delivering genetic material to the host cell's nucleus, which is vital for replication.

==== RNA-based viral vectors ====
RNA-based viruses were developed because of the ability to transcribe directly from infectious RNA transcripts. RNA vectors are quickly expressed and expressed in the targeted form since no processing is required [source needed]. Retroviral vectors include oncoretroviral, lentiviral and human foamy virus are RNA-based viral vectors that reverse transcript and integrated into the host genome, permits long-term transgene expression .

==== DNA-based viral vectors ====
DNA-based viral vectors include Adenoviridae, adeno-associated virus and herpes simplex virus.

== Applications ==
=== Gene therapy ===
Several of the methods used to facilitate gene delivery have applications for therapeutic purposes. Gene therapy utilizes gene delivery to deliver genetic material with the goal of treating a disease or condition in the cell. Gene delivery in therapeutic settings utilizes non-immunogenic vectors capable of cell specificity that can deliver an adequate amount of transgene expression to cause the desired effect.

Advances in genomics have enabled a variety of new methods and gene targets to be identified for possible applications. DNA microarrays used in a variety of next-gen sequencing can identify thousands of genes simultaneously, with analytical software looking at gene expression patterns, and orthologous genes in model species to identify function. This has allowed a variety of possible vectors to be identified for use in gene therapy. As a method for creating a new class of vaccine, gene delivery has been utilized to generate a hybrid biosynthetic vector to deliver a possible vaccine. This vector overcomes traditional barriers to gene delivery by combining E. coli with a synthetic polymer to create a vector that maintains plasmid DNA while having an increased ability to avoid degradation by target cell lysosomes.

== See also ==
- Gene targeting
- Minicircle
- Plasmid
- Transgene
- Vector (molecular biology)
- Viral vector
