= Tac-Promoter =

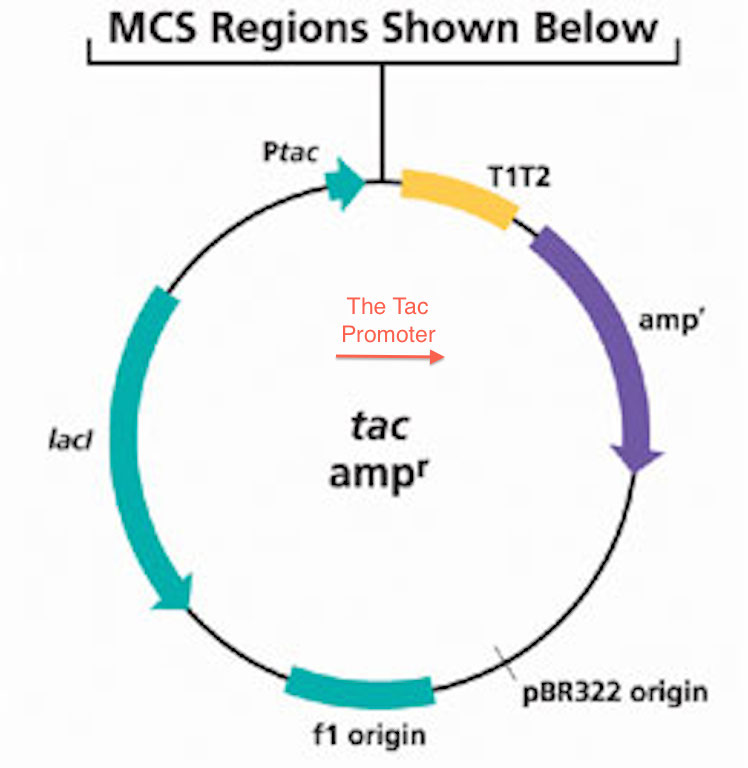
tac Vector for High-Level Bacterial Expression

The Tac-Promoter (abbreviated as Ptac), or tac vector is a synthetically produced DNA promoter, produced from the combination of promoters from the trp and lac operons. It is commonly used for protein production in Escherichia coli.

Two hybrid promoters functional in Escherichia coli were constructed. These hybrid promoters, tacI and tacII, were derived from sequences of the trp and the lac UV5 promoters. In the first hybrid promoter (tacI), the DNA upstream of position –20 with respect to the transcriptional start site was derived from the trp promoter. The DNA downstream of position –20 was derived from the lac UV5 promoter. In the second hybrid promoter (tacII), the DNA upstream of position –11 at the Hpa I site within the Pribnow box was derived from the trp promoter. The DNA downstream of position –11 is a 46-base-pair synthetic DNA fragment that specifies part of the hybrid Pribnow box and the entire lac operator. It also specifies a Shine–Dalgarno sequence flanked by two unique restriction sites (portable Shine–Dalgarno sequence).

The tacI and the tacII promoters respectively direct transcription approximately 11 and 7 times more efficiently than the derepressed parental lac UV5 promoter and approximately 3 and 2 times more efficiently than the trp promoter in the absence of the trp repressor. Both hybrid promoters can be repressed by the lac repressor and both can be derepressed with isopropyl-beta-D-thiogalactoside. Consequently, these hybrid promoters are useful for the controlled expression of foreign genes at high levels in E. coli. In contrast to the trp and the lac UV5 promoters, the tacI promoter has not only a consensus –35 sequence but also a consensus Pribnow box sequence. This may explain the higher efficiency of this hybrid promoter with respect to either one of the parental promoters.

== About ==
The tac promoter is used to control and increase the expression levels of a target gene and is used in the over-expression of recombinant proteins. The tac promoter is named after the two promoters which comprise its sequence: the 'trp' and the 'lac' promoters.

Bacterial promoters consist of two parts, the '–35' region and the '–10' region (the Pribnow box). These two regions bind the sigma factor of RNA polymerase, which then initiates transcription of the downstream gene. The tac promoter consists of the '–35' region of the trp promoter and the '–10' region of the lac promoter (and differs from a related trc promoter by 1 bp). The tac promoter is, therefore, inducible by IPTG (Isopropyl β-D-1-thiogalactopyranoside), whilst also allowing higher maximum gene expression than either the lac or trp promoters. This makes it suitable for high-efficiency protein production of a recombinant protein. The strong repression of expression in the 'off' state is important since foreign proteins can be toxic to the host cell.

== Applications ==
The tac promoter finds various applications. The tac promoter/operator (dubbed PTAC) is one of the most widely used expression systems. Ptac is a strong hybrid promoter composed of the –35 region of the trp promoter and the –10 region of the lacUV5 promoter/operator. The expression of PTAC is repressed by the lacI protein. The lacI^{q} allele is a promoter mutation that increases the intracellular concentration of LacI repressor, resulting in the strong repression of PTAC. The addition of the inducer IPTG inactivates the LacI repressor. Thus, the amount of expression from PTAC is proportional to the concentration of IPTG added: low concentrations of IPTG result in relatively low expression from PTAC and high concentrations of IPTG result in high expression from PTAC. By varying the IPTG concentration the amount of gene product cloned downstream from PTAC can be varied over several orders of magnitude. For example, the PTAC system is used for fusion protein expression within the PMAL-C2X expression.

== See also ==
- Human artificial chromosome
- Yeast artificial chromosome
- Bacterial artificial chromosome
