= Chengcang Charles Wu =

American geneticist

Chengcang Charles Wu is a Chinese-born American scientist with expertise in the fields of genetics, bioinformatics, and genomics, particularly large fragment DNA cloning and BAC (Bacterial Artificial Chromosome) library technologies.

== Accomplishments ==
Wu is the main contributor of the first soybean physical map. He is also one of the inventors of plant artificial chromosomes, Fungal Artificial Chromosomes and related technologies.

== Biotechnology involvement ==
Wu was the founding vice president of Lucigen Corporation. In 2013, Wu Founded Intact Genomics, Inc. in St. Louis Missouri.

== Education ==
Anhui Agricultural University, China, B.S., Biology. M.S., Genetics

Iwate University, Japan, Ph.D, Bioenvironmental Science
