= Extrachromosomal array =

An extrachromosomal array is a method for mosaic analysis in genetics. It is a cosmid, and contains two functioning (wild-type) closely linked genes: a gene of interest and a mosaic marker. Such an array is injected into germ line cells, which already contain mutant (specifically, loss of function) alleles of all three genes in their chromosomal DNA. The cosmid, which is not packed correctly during mitosis, is occasionally present in only one daughter cell following cell division. The daughter cell containing the array expresses the gene of interest; the cell lacking the array does not.

The mosaic marker is a gene which exhibits a visible phenotype change between the functioning and non-functioning alleles. For example, ncl-1, located in chromosomal DNA, exhibits a larger nucleolus than the wild-type allele, which is in the array. Thus, cells which exhibit larger nucleoli have usually not retained the extrachromosomal array.

The gene of interest is the target of the mosaic analysis. Cells lacking the extrachromosomal array also lack the functional gene of interest. Cells which develop normally without the array do not require the gene of interest for normal function. Cells which do not develop normally are said to require the gene. In this way, those cell lineages which require a specific gene can be identified.

Extrachromosomal arrays replace an earlier technique involving a duplicated piece of chromosome called a free duplication. The latter technique required that the gene of interest and the mosaic marker be closely linked on the duplication; the former allows free choice of mosaic marker and target gene.
