= MNDA =

Protein-coding gene in humans

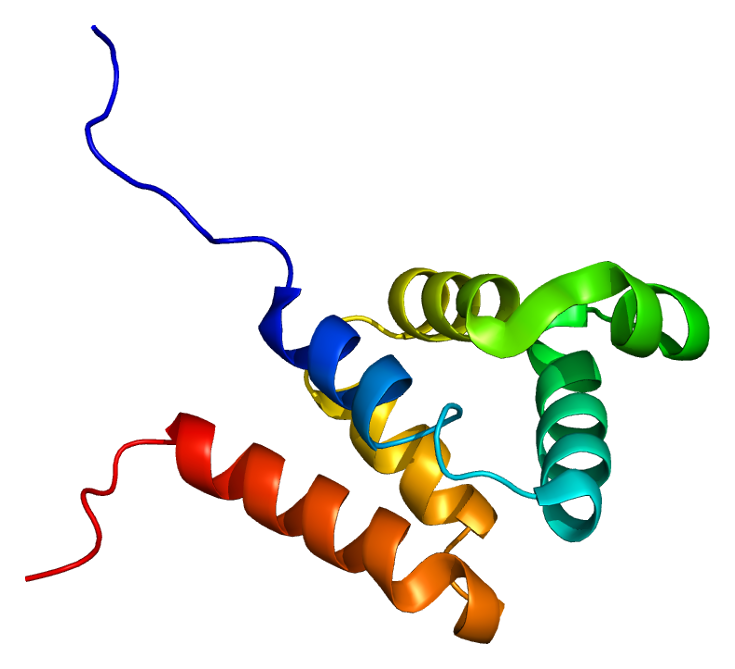

Identifiers
- Aliases: MNDA, PYHIN3, myeloid cell nuclear differentiation antigen
- External IDs: OMIM: 159553; GeneCards: MNDA
Available structures
PDB	Human UniProt search: PDBe RCSB
PDB	List of PDB id codes 2DBG

Gene location (Human)
Chr.	Chromosome 1 (human)
Band	1q23.1	Start	158,831,351 bp
Band	1q23.1	End	158,849,506 bp
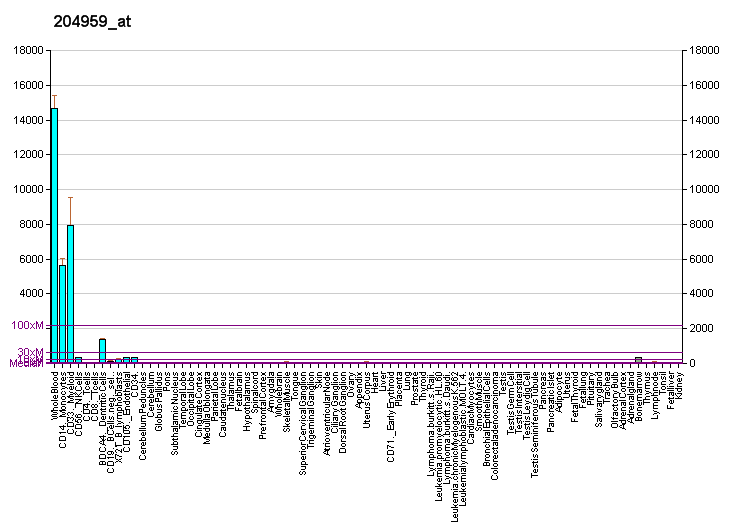
RNA expression pattern
Bgee	Human / Mouse (ortholog); Top expressed in: monocyte; trabecular bone; blood; granulocyte; bone marrow; periodontal fiber; germinal epithelium; bone marrow cell; spleen; palpebral conjunctiva / n/a; More reference expression data
BioGPS	More reference expression data
Gene ontology
Molecular function	DNA binding; protein binding; double-stranded DNA binding
Cellular component	cytoplasm; extracellular exosome; nucleus; extracellular region; nucleoplasm; nucleolus; azurophil granule lumen; ficolin-1-rich granule lumen
Biological process	B cell receptor signaling pathway; cellular defense response; regulation of transcription, DNA-templated; negative regulation of B cell proliferation; transcription, DNA-templated; cellular response to DNA damage stimulus; positive regulation of apoptotic process; neutrophil degranulation; activation of innate immune response; cellular response to interferon-beta; positive regulation of interleukin-1 beta production
Sources:Amigo / QuickGO
Orthologs
Databases	NCBI: entry; OMA: entry
Species	Human	Mouse
Entrez	4332	n/a
Ensembl	ENSG00000163563	n/a
UniProt	P41218	n/a
RefSeq (mRNA)	NM_002432	n/a
RefSeq (protein)	NP_002423	n/a
Location (UCSC)	Chr 1: 158.83 – 158.85 Mb	n/a
PubMed search		n/a
- Wikidata
View/Edit Human

Myeloid cell Nuclear Differentiation Antigen is a protein that in humans is encoded as MNDA gene.

== Function ==
The myeloid cell nuclear differentiation antigen (MNDA) is detected only in nuclei of cells of the granulocyte-monocyte lineage. A 200-amino acid region of human MNDA is strikingly similar to a region in the proteins encoded by a family of interferon-inducible mouse genes, designated Ifi-201, Ifi202, and Ifi-203, that are not regulated in a cell- or tissue-specific fashion. The 1.8-kb MNDA mRNA, which contains an interferon-stimulated response element in the 5' UTR, was significantly upregulated in human monocytes exposed to interferon alpha. MNDA is located within 2,200 kb of FCER1A, APCS, CRP, and SPTA1. In its pattern of expression and/or regulation, MNDA resembles IFI16, suggesting that these genes participate in blood cell-specific responses to interferons.
