= Shuttle vector =

A shuttle vector is a vector (usually a plasmid) constructed so that it can propagate in two different host species. Therefore, DNA inserted into a shuttle vector can be tested or manipulated in two different cell types. The main advantage of these vectors is they can be manipulated in E. coli, then used in a system which is more difficult or slower to use (e.g. yeast).

Shuttle vectors include plasmids that can propagate in eukaryotes and prokaryotes (e.g. both Saccharomyces cerevisiae and Escherichia coli) or in different species of bacteria (e.g. both E. coli and Rhodococcus erythropolis). There are also adenovirus shuttle vectors, which can propagate in E. coli and mammals.

Shuttle vectors are frequently used to quickly make multiple copies of the gene in E. coli (amplification). They can also be used for in vitro experiments and modifications (e.g. mutagenesis, PCR).

One of the most common types of shuttle vectors is the yeast shuttle vector. Almost all commonly used S. cerevisiae vectors are shuttle vectors. Yeast shuttle vectors have components that allow for replication and selection in both E. coli cells and yeast cells. The E. coli component of a yeast shuttle vector includes an origin of replication and a selectable marker, e.g. antibiotic resistance, beta lactamase, beta galactosidase. The yeast component of a yeast shuttle vector includes an autonomously replicating sequence (ARS), a yeast centromere (CEN), and a yeast selectable marker (e.g. URA3, a gene that encodes an enzyme for uracil synthesis, Lodish et al. 2007).

Because shuttle vectors are widely used in both prokaryotic and eukaryotic systems, representative and well-characterized examples are maintained by public biological resource centres and non-profit plasmid repositories, such as BCCM/GeneCorner and Addgene, to facilitate reproducibility and standardized research practice.
