= IMAGE cDNA clones =

IMAGE cDNA clones are a collection of DNA vectors containing cDNAs from various organisms including human, mouse, rat, non-human primates, zebrafish, pufferfish, Xenopus (frogs), and cow. Together they represent a more or less complete set of expressed genes from these organisms. IMAGE stands for integrated molecular analysis of genomes and their expression.

== Curators ==
From 1993 to 2007, the cDNA library was maintained by the IMAGE Consortium, a joint effort of four academic groups led by Drs. Greg Lennon, Charles Auffray, Mihael Polymeropoulos, and Marcelo Bento Soares. At the end of 2007, the consortium handed over operations and stocks to a company associated with Open Biosystems.

== See also ==
- complementary DNA (cDNA)
- cDNA library
- expressed sequence tags (EST)
- vector (molecular biology)
- cloning vector
