= Expressed sequence tag =

Sub-sequence DNA in genetics

In genetics, an expressed sequence tag (EST) is a short sub-sequence of a cDNA sequence. ESTs may be used to identify gene transcripts, and were instrumental in gene discovery and in gene-sequence determination. The identification of ESTs has proceeded rapidly, with approximately 74.2 million ESTs now available in public databases (e.g. GenBank 1 January 2013, all species). EST approaches have largely been superseded by whole genome and transcriptome sequencing and metagenome sequencing.

An EST results from one-shot sequencing of a cloned cDNA. The cDNAs used for EST generation are typically individual clones from a cDNA library. The resulting sequence is a relatively low-quality fragment whose length is limited by current technology to approximately 500 to 800 nucleotides. Because these clones consist of DNA that is complementary to mRNA, the ESTs represent portions of expressed genes. They may be represented in databases as either cDNA/mRNA sequence or as the reverse complement of the mRNA, the template strand.

One can map ESTs to specific chromosome locations using physical mapping techniques, such as radiation hybrid mapping, HAPPY mapping, or FISH. Alternatively, if the genome of the organism that originated the EST has been sequenced, one can align the EST sequence to that genome using a computer.

The current understanding of the human set of genes (as of 2006) includes the existence of thousands of genes based solely on EST evidence. In this respect, ESTs have become a tool to refine the predicted transcripts for those genes, which leads to the prediction of their protein products and ultimately of their function. Moreover, the situation in which those ESTs are obtained (tissue, organ, disease state - e.g. cancer) gives information on the conditions in which the corresponding gene is acting. ESTs contain enough information to permit the design of precise probes for DNA microarrays that then can be used to determine gene expression profiles.

Some authors use the term "EST" to describe genes for which little or no further information exists besides the tag.

== History ==
In 1979, teams at Harvard and Caltech extended the basic idea of making DNA copies of mRNAs in vitro to amplifying a library of such in bacterial plasmids.

In 1982, the idea of selecting random or semi-random clones from such a cDNA library for sequencing was explored by Greg Sutcliffe and coworkers.

In 1983, Putney et al. sequenced 178 clones from a rabbit muscle cDNA library.

In 1991, Adams and co-workers coined the term EST and initiated more systematic sequencing as a project (starting with 600 brain cDNAs).

== Sources of data and annotations ==
=== dbEST ===
The dbEST is a division of Genbank established in 1992. As for GenBank, data in dbEST is directly submitted by laboratories worldwide and is not curated.

=== EST contigs ===
Because of the way ESTs are sequenced, many distinct expressed sequence tags are often partial sequences that correspond to the same mRNA of an organism. In an effort to reduce the number of expressed sequence tags for downstream gene discovery analyses, several groups assembled expressed sequence tags into EST contigs. Example of resources that provide EST contigs include: TIGR gene indices, Unigene, and STACK

Constructing EST contigs is not trivial and may yield artifacts (contigs that contain two distinct gene products). When the complete genome sequence of an organism is available and transcripts are annotated, it is possible to bypass contig assembly and directly match transcripts with ESTs. This approach is used in the TissueInfo system (see below) and makes it easy to link annotations in the genomic database to tissue information provided by EST data.

=== Tissue information ===
High-throughput analyses of ESTs often encounter similar data management challenges. A first challenge is that tissue provenance of EST libraries is described in plain English in dbEST. This makes it difficult to write programs that can unambiguously determine that two EST libraries were sequenced from the same tissue. Similarly, disease conditions for the tissue are not annotated in a computationally friendly manner. For instance, cancer origin of a library is often mixed with the tissue name (e.g., the tissue name "glioblastoma" indicates that the EST library was sequenced from brain tissue and the disease condition is cancer). With the notable exception of cancer, the disease condition is often not recorded in dbEST entries. The TissueInfo project was started in 2000 to help with these challenges. The project provides curated data (updated daily) to disambiguate tissue origin and disease state (cancer/non cancer), offers a tissue ontology that links tissues and organs by "is part of" relationships (i.e., formalizes knowledge that hypothalamus is part of brain, and that brain is part of the central nervous system) and distributes open-source software for linking transcript annotations from sequenced genomes to tissue expression profiles calculated with data in dbEST.

== See also ==
- Gene expression
- Complementary DNA (cDNA)
- Transcriptomics
- IMAGE cDNA clones
- Whole genome sequencing (WGS)
