= Human artificial chromosome =

A human artificial chromosome (HAC) is a microchromosome that can act as a new chromosome in a population of human cells. That is, instead of 46 chromosomes, the cell could have 47 with the 47th being very small, roughly 6–10 megabases (Mb) in size instead of 50–250 Mb for natural chromosomes, and able to carry new genes introduced by human researchers. Ideally, researchers could integrate different genes that perform a variety of functions, including disease defense.

Alternative methods of creating transgenes, such as utilizing yeast artificial chromosomes and bacterial artificial chromosomes, lead to unpredictable problems. The genetic material introduced by these vectors not only leads to different expression levels, but the inserts also disrupt the original genome. HACs differ in this regard, as they are entirely separate chromosomes. This separation from existing genetic material assumes that no insertional mutants would arise. This stability and accuracy makes HACs preferable to other methods such as viral vectors, YACs, and BACs. HACs allow for delivery of more DNA (including promoters and copy-number variation) than is possible with viral vectors.

Yeast artificial chromosomes and bacterial artificial chromosomes were created before human artificial chromosomes, which were first developed in 1997. HACs are useful in expression studies as gene transfer vectors, as a tool for elucidating human chromosome function, and as a method for actively annotating the human genome.

== History ==
HACs were first constructed de novo in 1997 by adding alpha-satellite DNA to telomeric and genomic DNA in human HT1080 cells. This resulted in an entirely new microchromosome that contained DNA of interest, as well as elements allowing it to be structurally and mitotically stable, such as telomeric and centromeric sequences. Due to the difficulty of de novo HAC formation, this method has largely been abandoned.

== Construction methods ==
There are currently two accepted models for the creation of human artificial chromosome vectors. The first is to create a small minichromosome by altering a natural human chromosome. This is accomplished by truncating the natural chromosome, followed by the introduction of unique genetic material via the Cre-Lox system of recombination. The second method involves the literal creation of a novel chromosome de novo. Progress regarding de novo HAC formation has been limited, as many large genomic fragments will not successfully integrate into de novo vectors. Another factor limiting de novo vector formation is limited knowledge of what elements are required for construction, specifically centromeric sequences. Challenges involving centromeric sequences are being overcome.

== Applications ==
A 2009 study has shown additional benefits of HACs, namely their ability to stably contain extremely large genomic fragments. Researchers incorporated the 2.4 Mb dystrophin gene, in which a mutation is a key causal element of Duchenne muscular dystrophy. The resulting HAC was mitotically stable, and correctly expressed dystrophin in chimeric mice. Previous attempts at correctly expressing dystrophin have failed. Due to its large size, it has never before been successfully integrated into a vector.

In 2010, a refined human artificial chromosome called 21HAC was reported. 21HAC is based on a stripped copy of human chromosome 21, producing a chromosome 5 Mb in length. Truncation of chromosome 21 resulted in a human artificial chromosome that was mitotically stable. 21HAC was also able to be transferred into cells from a variety of species (mice, chickens, humans). Using 21HAC, researchers were able to insert a herpes simplex virus thymidine kinase coding gene into tumor cells. This "suicide gene" is required to activate many antiviral medications. These targeted tumor cells were successfully, and selectively, terminated by the antiviral drug ganciclovir in a population including healthy cells. This research opens a variety of opportunities for using HACs in gene therapy.

In 2011, researchers formed a human artificial chromosome by truncating chromosome 14. Genetic material was then introduced using the Cre-Lox recombination system. This particular study focused on changes in expression levels by leaving portions of the existing genomic DNA. By leaving existing telomeric and sub-telomeric sequences, researchers were able to amplify expression levels of genes coding for erythropoietin production over 1000-fold. This work also has large gene therapy implications, as erythropoietin controls red blood cell formation.

HACs have been used to create transgenic animals for use as animal models of human disease and for production of therapeutic products.

== See also ==
- Plasmid
- Cosmid
- Fosmid
