= Ifi202 =

Ifi202 is a mouse gene (encodes for the p202 protein). Increased expression levels of the Ifi202 mRNA and nuclear localization of p202 protein in immune cells are associated with the development of autoimmunity in certain strains of mice. Therefore, the gene has been implicated in the development of systemic lupus erythematosus (SLE). SLE is a systemic autoimmune disease responsible for attacking many types of organs. Ifi202 gene encodes for p202 protein, which belongs to the p200-protein family. The IFI family of genes is inducible by type 1 interferon and interferon gamma.

The relationship between increased ifi202 expression and SLE was first suggested by Rozzo et al. in 2001. It was discovered due to the over-expression of p202 in splenic B cells of mice showing similar symptoms as lupus. Currently the prototypical mouse model for SLE is (NZWxNZB)F1, which is short for the first generation offspring of New Zealand Black and New Zealand White mice. The overproduction of p202 seems to lead to the suppression of p53 protein, which is a regulatory protein in the process of apoptosis. This is hypothesized to contribute to some of the symptoms of SLE.

The p202 protein has the following structure

- A 52kDa nuclear phosphoprotein

Humans have an ifi202 and ifi204 similar gene known as ifi16. They share some similarities in the amino acid sequence.

Ifi202 is known to be regulated by IL-6. The binding of IL-6 to its receptors leads to the activation STAT3 (Signal Transducer and Transcription 3), which seems to be a transcription factor in the expression of Ifi202. Ifi202 contains a STAT3 binding site (SBS) at the 5’ regulatory region of the ifi202 gene. p202 expression is known to retard cell proliferation and increases cell survival.

Gene 200 cluster is located on Chromosome 1 of murine genome. Nba2 locus is suspected to be a major contributor to the susceptibility of mice to SLE. Ifi202 and ifi203, both of which seem to be linked to SLE susceptibility, are within Nba2 interval. Using quantitative PCR, it was shown that splenic B cells and non-B/non-T cell have increased ifi202 expression in SLE susceptible mice. Based on the knowledge that ifi202 gene is a regulator of apoptosis and cell proliferation, ifi202 was implicated in the autoimmune disease SLE.

Using in B6.Nba2 lupus susceptible mice as the animal model, researchers were able to show increased expression of Ifi202 inhibits p53-mediated apoptosis of splenic B cells. Since it is known that p53 mediates the expression of proapoptotic proteins, the increased p202 correlates with increased p53 levels. p202 seems to bind to p53 protein in the N-terminal region to inhibit p53 function.

The expression of p53 appears to inhibit the expression of ifi202. Levels of p202 decrease after exposure of cells to UV light, while p53 levels increase. Overexpression of p202 in cells decreased the p53 mediated apoptosis.
