= Bacterial artificial chromosome =

DNA construct

A bacterial artificial chromosome (BAC) is a DNA construct, based on a functional fertility plasmid (or F-plasmid), used for transforming and cloning in bacteria, usually E. coli. F-plasmids play a crucial role because they contain partition genes that promote the even distribution of plasmids after bacterial cell division. The bacterial artificial chromosome's usual insert size is 150–350 kbp. A similar cloning vector called a PAC has also been produced from the DNA of P1 bacteriophage.

BACs were often used to sequence the genomes of organisms in genome projects, for example the Human Genome Project, though they have been replaced by more modern technologies. In BAC sequencing, short piece of the organism's DNA is amplified as an insert in BACs, and then sequenced. Finally, the sequenced parts are rearranged in silico, resulting in the genomic sequence of the organism. BACs were replaced with faster and less laborious sequencing methods like whole genome shotgun sequencing and now more recently next-gen sequencing.

== Common gene components ==
repE
for plasmid replication and regulation of copy number.
parA and parB
for partitioning F plasmid DNA to daughter cells during division and ensures stable maintenance of the BAC.
A selectable marker
for antibiotic resistance; some BACs also have lacZ at the cloning site for blue/white selection.
T7 & Sp6
phage promoters for transcription of inserted genes.

== Disease modeling ==
=== Inherited ===
BACs are now being utilized to a greater extent in modeling genetic disease, often alongside transgenic mice. BACs have been useful in this field as complex genes may have several regulatory sequences upstream of the encoding sequence, including various promoter sequences that will govern a gene's expression level. BACs have been used to some degree of success with mice when studying neurological diseases such as Alzheimer's disease or as in the case of aneuploidy associated with Down syndrome. There have also been instances when they have been used to study specific oncogenes associated with cancers. They are transferred over to these genetic disease models by electroporation/transformation, transfection with a suitable virus or microinjection. BACs can also be utilized to detect genes or large sequences of interest and then used to map them onto the human chromosome using BAC arrays. BACs are preferred for these kind of genetic studies because they accommodate much larger sequences without the risk of rearrangement, and are therefore more stable than other types of cloning vectors.

=== Infectious ===
The genomes of several large DNA viruses and RNA viruses have been cloned as BACs. These constructs are referred to as "infectious clones", as transfection of the BAC construct into host cells is sufficient to initiate viral infection. The infectious property of these BACs has made the study of many viruses such as the herpesviruses, poxviruses and coronaviruses more accessible. Molecular studies of these viruses can now be achieved using genetic approaches to mutate the BAC while it resides in bacteria. Such genetic approaches rely on either linear or circular targeting vectors to carry out homologous recombination.

== See also ==
- Cosmid
- End-sequence profiling
- Fosmid
- Human artificial chromosome
- Secondary chromosome
- Yeast artificial chromosome
