= Autonomously replicating sequence =

An autonomously replicating sequence (ARS or ars) contains the origin of replication in the yeast genome. The ARS of S. cerevisiae is a minimal 125 bp, and contains four regions (A, B1, B2, and B3), named in order of their effect on plasmid stability. The A-Domain is highly conserved, any mutation abolishes origin function. Mutations on B1, B2, and B3 will diminish, but not prevent functioning of the origin.

Element A is highly conserved, consisting of the consensus sequence:

5'- T/A T T T A Y R T T T T/A -3'

(where Y is either pyrimidine and R is either purine). When this element is mutated, the ARS loses all activity.

As seen above the ARS are considerably A-T rich which makes it easy for replicative proteins to disrupt the H-bonding in that area. ORC protein complex (origin recognition complex) is bound at the ARS throughout the cell cycle, allowing replicative proteins access to the ARS.

Mutational analysis for the yeast ARS elements have shown that any mutation in the B1, B2 and B3 regions result in a reduction of function of the ARS element. A mutation in the A region results in a complete loss of function.

Melting of DNA occurs within domain B2, induced by attachment of ARS binding factor 1 to B3. A1 and B1 domain binds with origin recognition complex.

To identify these sequences, yeast mutants unable to synthesize histidine were transformed with plasmids containing the His gene and random fragments of the yeast genome. If the genome fragment contained an origin of replication, cells were able to grow in a medium lacking histidine. These sequences were termed autonomously replicating sequences, because they were replicated and inherited by progeny without integrating into the host chromosome.
