= Selectable marker =

Gene conferring a phenotype useful for artificial selection

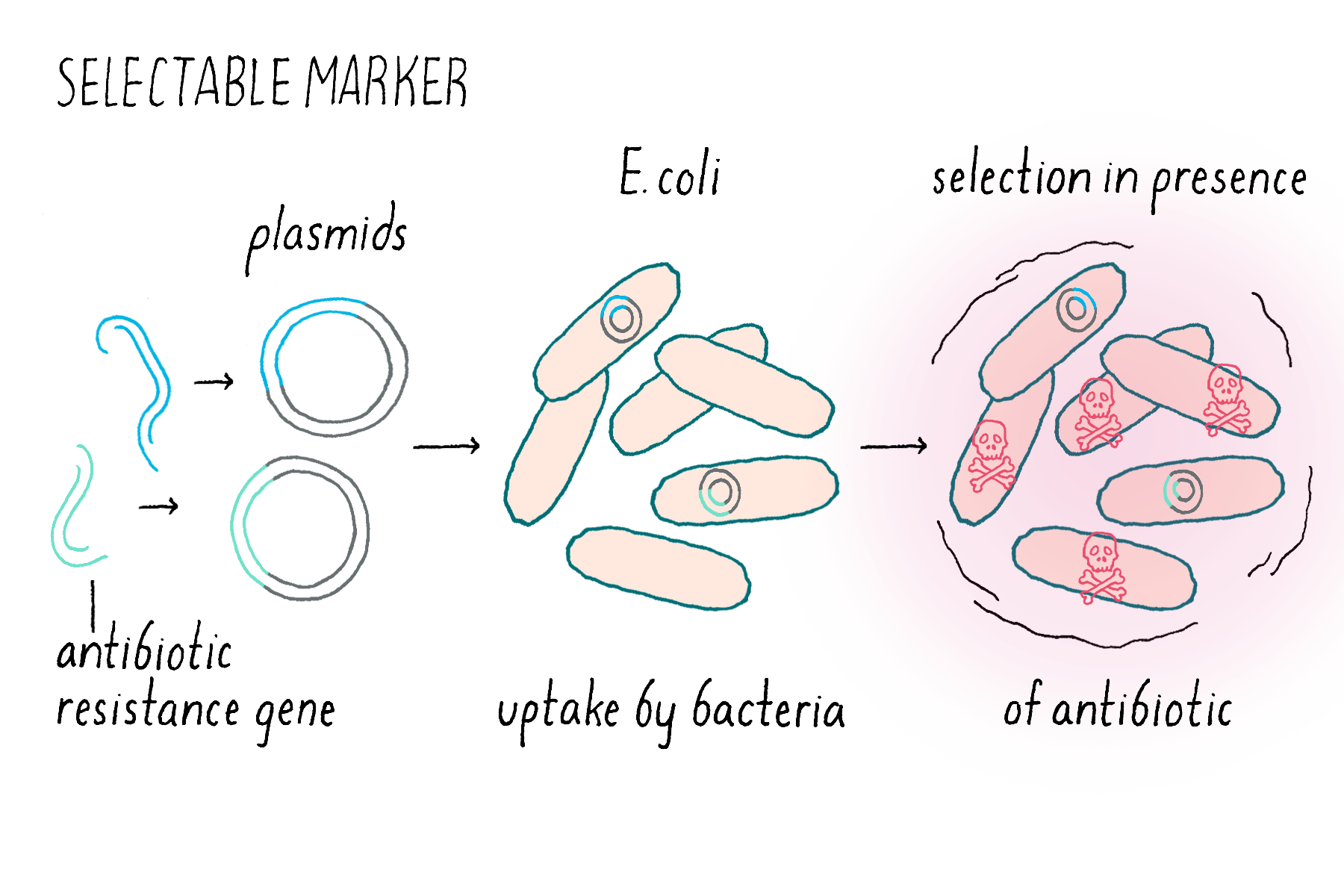
A selectable marker for antibiotic resistance on a plasmid allows only those bacteria that acquire the plasmid to live in the presence of the antibiotic.

A selectable marker is a gene introduced into cells, especially bacteria or cells in culture, which confers one or more traits suitable for artificial selection. They are a type of reporter gene used in laboratory microbiology, molecular biology, and genetic engineering to indicate the success of a transfection or transformation or other procedure meant to introduce foreign DNA into a cell. Selectable markers are often antibiotic resistance genes: bacteria subjected to a procedure by which exogenous DNA containing an antibiotic resistance gene (usually alongside other genes of interest) has been introduced are grown on a medium containing an antibiotic, such that only those bacterial cells which have successfully taken up and expressed the introduced genetic material, including the gene which confers antibiotic resistance, can survive and produce colonies. The genes encoding resistance to antibiotics such as ampicillin, chloramphenicol, tetracycline, kanamycin, etc., are all widely used as selectable markers for molecular cloning and other genetic engineering techniques in E. coli.

== Modus operandi ==
Selectable markers allow scientists to separate non-recombinant organisms (those which do not contain the selectable marker) from recombinant organisms (those which do); that is, a recombinant DNA molecule such as a plasmid expression vector is introduced into bacterial cells, and some bacteria are successfully transformed while some remain non-transformed. Antibiotics such as ampicillin, at sufficient concentrations, are toxic to most bacteria, which ordinarily lack resistance to them; when cultured on a nutrient medium containing ampicillin, bacteria lacking ampicillin resistance fail to divide and eventually die. The position is later noted on nitrocellulose paper and separated out to move them to a nutrient medium for mass production of the required product. An alternative to a selectable marker is a screenable marker, another type of reporter gene which allows the researcher to distinguish between wanted and unwanted cells or colonies, such as between blue and white colonies in blue–white screening. These wanted or unwanted cells are simply non-transformed cells that were unable to take up the screenable gene during the experiment.

== Positive and negative markers ==
For molecular biology research, different types of markers may be used based on the selection sought. These include:

- Positive or selection markers are selectable markers that confer selective advantage to the host organism. An example would be antibiotic resistance, which allows the host organism to survive antibiotic selection.
- Negative or counterselectable markers are selectable markers that eliminate or inhibit growth of the host organism upon selection. An example would be thymidine kinase, which makes the host sensitive to ganciclovir selection.
- Selectable markers may serve as both positive and negative markers by conferring an advantage to the host under one condition, but inhibiting growth under a different condition. An example would be an enzyme that can complement an auxotrophy (positive selection) and be able to convert a chemical to a toxic compound (negative selection).

== Common examples ==
Examples of selectable markers include:

- Beta-lactamase, which confers ampicillin resistance to bacterial hosts.
- Neo gene from Tn5, which confers resistance to kanamycin in bacteria and geneticin in eukaryotic cells.
- Mutant FabI gene (mFabI) from the E. coli genome, which confers triclosan resistance to the host.
- URA3, an orotidine-5' phosphate decarboxylase from yeast, is a positive and negative selectable marker. It is required for uracil biosynthesis and can complement URA3 mutants that are auxotrophic for uracil (positive selection). The enzyme URA3 also converts 5-fluoroorotic acid (5FOA) into the toxic compound 5-fluorouracil, so any cells carrying the URA3 gene will be killed in the presence of 5FOA (negative selection).

== Future developments ==
In the future, alternative marker technologies will need to be used more often to, at the least, assuage concerns about their persistence into the final product. It is also possible that markers will be replaced entirely by future techniques which use removable markers, and others which do not use markers at all, instead relying on co-transformation, homologous recombination, and recombinase-mediated excision.

== See also ==
- Genetic marker
- Marker gene
- Biomarker
