= Fosmid =

Type of hybrid plasmid

Fosmids are similar to cosmids but are based on the bacterial F-plasmid. The cloning vector is limited, as a host (usually E. coli) can only contain one fosmid molecule. Fosmids can hold DNA inserts of up to 40 kb in size; often the source of the insert is random genomic DNA. A fosmid library is prepared by extracting the genomic DNA from the target organism and cloning it into the fosmid vector. The ligation mix is then packaged into phage particles and the DNA is transfected into the bacterial host. Bacterial clones propagate the fosmid library. The low copy number offers higher stability than vectors with relatively higher copy numbers, including cosmids. Fosmids may be useful for constructing stable libraries from complex genomes. Fosmids have high structural stability and have been found to maintain human DNA effectively even after 100 generations of bacterial growth. Fosmid clones were used to help assess the accuracy of the Public Human Genome Sequence.

== Discovery ==
The fertility plasmid or F-plasmid was discovered by Esther Lederberg and encodes information for the biosynthesis of sex pilus to aid in bacterial conjugation. Conjugation involves using the sex pilus to form a bridge between two bacteria cells; this bridge allows the F+ cell to transfer a single-stranded copy of the plasmid so that both cells contain a copy of the plasmid. On the way into the recipient cell, the corresponding DNA strand is synthesized by the recipient. The donor cell maintains a functional copy of the plasmid. It later was discovered that the F factor was the first episome and can exist as an independent plasmid making it a very stable vector for cloning. Conjugation aids in the formation of bacterial clone libraries by ensuring all cells contain the desired fosmid.

Fosmids are DNA vectors that use the F-plasmid origin of replication and partitioning mechanisms to allow cloning of large DNA fragments. A library that provides 20–70-fold redundant coverage of the genome can easily be prepared.

== DNA libraries ==
The first step in sequencing entire genomes is cloning the genome into manageable units of some 50-200 kilobases in length. It is ideal to use a fosmid library because of its stability and limitation of one plasmid per cell. By limiting the number of plasmids in the cells the potential for recombination is decreased, thus preserving the genome insert.

Fosmids contain several functional elements:

- oriT (Origin of Transfer): The sequence which marks the starting point of conjugative transfer.
- oriV (Origin of Replication): The sequence starting with which the plasmid-DNA will be replicated in the recipient cell.
- tra-region (transfer genes): Genes coding the F-Pilus and DNA transfer process.
- IS (Insertion Elements): so-called "selfish genes" (sequence fragments which can integrate copies of themselves at different locations).

The methods of cutting and inserting DNA into fosmid vectors have been perfected. There are now many companies that can create a fosmid library from any sample of DNA in a very short period of time at a relatively low cost. This has been vital in allowing researchers to sequence numerous genomes for study. Through a variety of methods, more than 6651 organisms genomes have been fully sequenced, with 58,695 ongoing.

== Uses ==
Sometimes it is difficult to accurately distinguish individual chromosomes based on chromosome length, arm ratio, and C-banding pattern. Fosmids can be used as reliable cytological markers for individual chromosome identification and fluorescent in situ hybridization based metaphase chromosome karyotypes can be used to show whether the positions of these fosmids were successfully constructed.

The fosmid system is excellent for rapidly creating chromosome-specific mini-BAC libraries from flow-sorted chromosomal DNA. The major advantage of Fosmids over other cosmid systems lies in its capability of stably propagating human DNA fragments. Highly repetitive in nature, human DNA is well known for its extreme instability in multicopy vector systems. It has been found that the stability increases dramatically when the human DNA inserts are present in single copies in recombination deficient E. coli cells. Therefore, Fosmids serve as reliable substrates for large scale genomic DNA sequencing.
