= Plant transformation vector =

Plant transformation vectors are plasmids that have been specifically designed to facilitate the generation of transgenic plants. The most commonly used plant transformation vectors are T-DNA binary vectors and are often replicated in both E. coli, a common lab bacterium, and Agrobacterium tumefaciens, a plant-virulent bacterium used to insert the recombinant DNA into plants.

Plant transformation vectors contain three key elements:

- Plasmids Selection (creating a custom circular strand of DNA)
- Plasmids Replication (so that it can be easily worked with)
- Transfer DNA (T-DNA) region (inserting the DNA into the agrobacteria)

== Steps in plant transformation ==
A custom DNA plasmid sequence can be created and replicated in various ways, but generally, all methods share the following processes:

Plant transformation using plasmids begins with the propagation of the binary vector in E. coli. When the bacterial culture reaches the appropriate density, the binary vector is isolated and purified. Then, a foreign gene can be introduced. The engineered binary vector, including the foreign gene, is re-introduced in E. coli for amplification.

The engineered binary factor is isolated from E. coli and is introduced into Agrobacteria containing a modified (relatively small) Ti plasmid. This engineered Agrobacteria can be used to infect plant cells. The T-DNA, which contains the foreign gene, becomes integrated into the plant cell genome. In each infected cell, the T-DNA is integrated at a different site in the genome.

The entire plant will regenerate from a single transformed cell, resulting in an organism with the transformed DNA integrated identically across all cells.

=== Consequences of the insertion ===
- Foreign DNA inserted
- Insertional mutagenesis (but not lethal for the plant cell – as the organism is diploid)
- Transformation DNA fed to rodents ends up in their phagocytes and rarely in other cells. Specifically, this refers to bacterial and M13 DNA. (This preferential accumulation in phagocytes is thought to be real and not a detection artefact since these DNA sequences are thought to provoke phagocytosis.) However, no gene expression is known to have resulted, and this is not thought to be possible.

== Plasmid selection ==
A selector gene can be used to distinguish successfully genetically modified cells from unmodified ones. The selector gene is integrated into the plasmid along with the desired target gene, providing the cells with resistance to an antibiotic, such as kanamycin, ampicillin, spectinomycin or tetracycline. The desired cells, along with any other organisms growing within the culture, can be treated with an antibiotic, allowing only the modified cells to survive. The antibiotic gene is not usually transferred to the plant cell but instead remains within the bacterial cell.

== Plasmids replication ==
Plasmids replicate to produce many plasmid molecules in each host bacterial cell. The number of copies of each plasmid in a bacterial cell is determined by the replication origin, which is the position within the plasmid molecule where DNA replication is initiated. Most binary vectors have a higher number of plasmid copies when they replicate in E. coli; however, the plasmid copy-number is usually lower when the plasmid is resident within Agrobacterium tumefaciens. Plasmids can also be replicated using the polymerase chain reaction (PCR).

== T-DNA region ==
T-DNA contains two types of genes: the oncogenic genes, encoding for enzymes involved in the synthesis of auxins and cytokinins and responsible for tumor formation, and the genes encoding for the synthesis of opines. These compounds, produced by the condensation between amino acids and sugars, are synthesized and excreted by the crown gall cells, and they are consumed by A. tumefaciens as carbon and nitrogen sources.

The genes involved in opine catabolism, T-DNA transfer from the bacterium to the plant cell and bacterium-bacterium plasmid conjugative transfer are located outside the T-DNA. The T-DNA fragment is flanked by 25-bp direct repeats, which act as a cis-element signal for the transfer apparatus. The process of T-DNA transfer is mediated by the cooperative action of proteins encoded by genes determined in the Ti plasmid virulence region (vir genes) and in the bacterial chromosome. The Ti plasmid also contains the genes for opine catabolism produced by the crown gall cells and regions for conjugative transfer and for its own integrity and stability. The 30 kb virulence (vir) region is a regulon organized in six operons essential for the T-DNA transfer (virA, virB, virD, and virG) or for the increasing of transfer efficiency (virC and virE). Several chromosomal-determined genetic elements have shown their functional role in the attachment of A. tumefaciens to the plant cell and bacterial colonization. The loci chvA and chvB are involved in the synthesis and excretion of the b -1,2 glucan, the chvE required for the sugar enhancement of vir genes induction and bacterial chemotaxis. The cell locus is responsible for the synthesis of cellulose fibrils. The pscA (exoC) locus is involved in the synthesis of both cyclic glucan and acid succinoglycan. The att locus is involved in the cell surface proteins.
