= Cosmid =

Type of hybrid plasmid

A cosmid is a type of hybrid plasmid that contains a Lambda phage cos sequence. Often used as cloning vectors in genetic engineering, cosmids can be used to build genomic libraries. They were first described by Collins and Hohn in 1978. Cosmids can contain 37 to 52 (normally 45) kb of DNA, limits based on the normal bacteriophage packaging size. They can replicate as plasmids if they have a suitable origin of replication (ori): for example SV40 ori in mammalian cells, ColE1 ori for double-stranded DNA replication, or f1 ori for single-stranded DNA replication in prokaryotes. They frequently also contain a gene for selection such as antibiotic resistance, so that the transformed cells can be identified by plating on a medium containing the antibiotic. Those cells which did not take up the cosmid would be unable to grow.

Unlike plasmids, they can also be packaged in vitro into phage capsids, a step which requires cohesive ends, also known as cos sites also used in cloning with a lambda phage as a vector, however nearly all the lambda genes have been deleted with the exception of the cos sequence. The hybrid cosmid DNA in the capsids can then be transferred into bacterial cells by transduction. Since there is a requirement for in vitro packaging whereby at least 38 kb of DNA is required between the cos sites, the vector without insert DNA will not be packaged (plasmids instability is increased if the novel inserted DNA contains many direct repeats or palindromic (inverted repeats) DNA. This instability can largely be counteracted by using a host bacterium with specific mutations affecting DNA recombination (N.B. Absence of inverted repeats was noted in the first Hohn & Collins publication cited above; see also).

== Cos sequences ==
Cos sequences are ~200 base pairs long and essential for packaging. They contain a cosN site where DNA is nicked at each strand, 12 bp apart, by terminase. This causes linearization of the circular cosmid with two "cohesive" or "sticky ends" of 12bp. (The DNA must be linear to fit into a phage head.) The cosB site holds the terminase while it is nicking and separating the strands. The cosQ site of next cosmid (as rolling circle replication often results in linear concatemers) is held by the terminase after the previous cosmid has been packaged, to prevent degradation by cellular DNases.

== Cosmid features and uses ==
Scheme of DNA cloning in a cosmid vector.

Cosmids are predominantly plasmids with a bacterial oriV, an antibiotic selection marker and a cloning site, but they carry one, or more recently two, cos sites derived from bacteriophage lambda. Depending on the particular aim of the experiment, broad host range cosmids, shuttle cosmids or 'mammalian' cosmids (linked to SV40 oriV and mammalian selection markers) are available. The loading capacity of cosmids varies depending on the size of the vector itself but usually lies around 40–45 kb. The cloning procedure involves the generation of two vector arms which are then joined to the foreign DNA. Selection against wild type cosmid DNA is simply done via size exclusion. Cosmids, therefore, always form colonies and not plaques. Also the clone density is much lower with around 10^{5} – 10^{6} CFU per μg of ligated DNA.

After the construction of recombinant lambda or cosmid libraries the total DNA is transferred into an appropriate E. coli host via a technique called in vitro packaging. The necessary packaging extracts are derived from E. coli cI857 lysogens (red- gam- Sam and Dam (head assembly) and Eam (tail assembly) respectively). These extracts will recognize and package the recombinant molecules in vitro, generating either mature phage particles (lambda-based vectors) or recombinant plasmids contained in phage shells (cosmids). These differences are reflected in the different infection frequencies seen in favour of lambda-replacement vectors. This compensates for their slightly lower loading capacity. Phage libraries are also stored and screened more easily than cosmid libraries.

Target DNA: the genomic DNA to be cloned has to be cut into the appropriate size range of restriction fragments. This is usually done by partial restriction followed by either size fractionation or dephosphorylation (using calf-intestine phosphatase) to avoid chromosome scrambling, i.e. the ligation of physically unlinked fragments.

== Examples of cosmid vectors ==
Commonly used vectors include "SuperCos 1"
