= Michael Wendl =

Michael Wendl may refer to:

- Michael Christopher Wendl, mathematician and biomedical engineer
- Michael J. Wendl (born 1934), engineer in the area of aerospace control
