= Alan Coulson =

Biochemist

Alan Coulson (born 1947) is a British biotechnology pioneer and genome scientist. He is best known for his work on developing DNA sequencing technologies with Frederick Sanger and his contributions to the Caenorhabditis elegans and human genome projects.

== Biography ==
Alan Coulson was born in Cambridge in 1947 and as a youth attended the Cambridge Grammar School for Boys and subsequently the Deacon's School in Peterborough. He achieved his higher national diploma in Applied Biology from Leicester Polytechnic in 1967.

Under the mentorship of John Sulston, Coulson completed his PhD titled The Physical Map of the C. elegans Genome, in 1994.

== Career ==
Coulson joined Sanger's group at the Medical Research Council’s Laboratory of Molecular Biology (LMB) as a technician in 1967, shortly after receiving his diploma. With Sanger, Coulson developed many of the early DNA sequencing technologies, including the DNA polymerase primed synthesis ("plus and minus") technique and, eventually, dideoxynucleotide chain-terminating sequencing, which was later termed Sanger sequencing.

Sanger readily acknowledged Coulson's contributions to the development of DNA sequencing technologies, describing him as "my main collaborator in the later DNA work".

After Sanger's retirement in 1983, Coulson contributed to the physical mapping and genome sequencing project of the nematode C. elegans, led by John Sulston and Bob Waterston at the LMB and subsequently the Sanger Centre. This effort was the first to produce the complete genome sequence of an animal. Coulson later contributed to the human genome project.

Coulson left the Sanger Center (by then renamed the Wellcome Trust Sanger Institute) in 2003 and returned to work at the LMB until his retirement in 2007.
