= Michael Christopher Wendl =

American mathematician and biomedical engineer

Michael Wendl
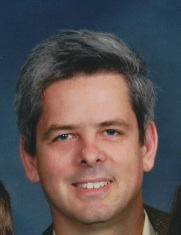
- Education: Washington University in St. Louis
- Known for: Phred base calling Couette flow DNA sequencing theory
- Scientific career
- Fields: Computational biology Probability
- Doctoral advisor: Ramesh K. Agarwal
- Other academic advisors: Bob Waterston (post-doctoral)
- Website: wendl.weebly.com

Michael Christopher Wendl is a mathematician and biomedical engineer who has worked on DNA sequencing theory, covering and matching problems in probability, theoretical fluid mechanics, and co-wrote Phred. He was a scientist on the Human Genome Project and has done bioinformatics and biostatistics work in cancer. Wendl is of ethnic German heritage and is the son of the aerospace engineer Michael J. Wendl.

== Research Work ==
=== Theoretical Fluid Mechanics ===
The problem of low Reynolds number flow in the gap between 2 infinite cylinders, so-called Couette flow, was solved in 1845 by Stokes. Wendl reported the generalization of this solution for finite-length cylinders, which can actually be built for experimental work, in 1999, as a series of modified Bessel functions $I_1$ and $K_1$. He also examined a variety of other low Reynolds number rotational devices and shear-driven devices, including a general form of the unsteady disk flow problem, for which the velocity profile is:

$u(r,z,t) = \Re\left(e^{i\sigma t}\left[\frac{r\cdot\sinh(1+i)\beta z}{\sinh(1+i)\beta \phi}\right] + \frac{2}{\phi}\sum_{j=1}^{\infty}\frac{(-1)^j\cdot\alpha_j^2\cdot\sin(\alpha_j z)\cdot I_1\left(\sqrt{i R \sigma + \alpha_j^2} r\right)}{(i R \sigma + \alpha_j^2)\cdot I_1\left(\sqrt{i R \sigma + \alpha_j^2}\right)}\right)$

where $\sigma$, $R$, $\beta$, and $\phi$ are physical parameters, $\alpha_j$ are eigen-values, and $(r, z, t)$ are coordinates. This result united prior-published special cases for steady flow, infinite disks, etc.

=== Covering and Matching Problems in Probability ===
Wendl examined a number of matching and covering problems in combinatorial probability, especially as these problems apply to molecular biology. He determined the distribution of match counts of pairs of integer multisets in terms of Bell polynomials, a problem directly relevant to physical mapping of DNA. Prior to this, investigators had used a number of ad-hoc quantifiers, like the Sulston score, which idealized match trials as being independent. His result for the multiple-group birthday proposition solves various related "collision problems", e.g. some types of P2P searching. He has also examined a variety of 1-dimensional covering problems (see review by Cyril Domb), generalizing the basic configuration to forms relevant to molecular biology. His covering investigation of rare DNA variants with Richard K. Wilson played a role in designing the 1000 Genomes Project.

=== Bioinformatics and Biostatistics ===
Wendl co-wrote Phred, a widely used DNA trace analyzer that converted raw output stream of early DNA sequence machines to sequence strings. He has contributed extensively to biostatistical analysis of cancer studies and to the bioinformatics toolbase, collaborating frequently with Li Ding, Elaine Mardis, and Richard K. Wilson.

== Personal life ==
Wendl's heritage is ethnic German, originating from the Banat region of the old Austro-Hungarian Empire and is a historian of Danube-Swabian folk music. He is the son of the aerospace engineer Michael J. Wendl. He is married to the former Pamela Bjerkness of Chicago
