= Physical mapping =

Methods to find sequence of bases on chromosomes

Physical map is a technique used in molecular biology to find the order and physical distance between DNA base pairs by DNA markers. It is one of the gene mapping techniques which can determine the sequence of DNA base pairs with high accuracy. Genetic mapping, another approach of gene mapping, can provide markers needed for the physical mapping. However, as the former deduces the relative gene position by recombination frequencies, it is less accurate than the latter.

Physical mapping uses DNA fragments and DNA markers to assemble larger DNA pieces. With the overlapping regions of the fragments, researchers can deduce the positions of the DNA bases. There are different techniques to visualize the gene location, including somatic cell hybridization, radiation hybridization and in situ hybridization.

The different approaches to physical mapping are available for analyzing different sizes of genome and achieving different levels of accuracy. Low- and high-resolution mapping are two classes for various resolution of genome, particularly for the investigation of chromosomes. The three basic varieties of physical mapping are fluorescent in situ hybridization (FISH), restriction site mapping and sequencing by clones.

The goal of physical mapping, as a common mechanism under genomic analysis, is to obtain a complete genome sequence in order to deduce any association between the target DNA sequence and phenotypic traits. If the actual positions of genes which control certain phenotypes are known, it is possible to resolve genetic diseases by providing advice on prevention and developing new treatments.

== Low-resolution mapping ==
Low-resolution physical mapping is typically capable of resolving DNA ranging from one base pair to several mega bases. In this category, most mapping methods involve generating a somatic cell hybrid panel, which is able to map any human DNA sequences, the gene of interest, to specific chromosomes of animal cells, such as those of mice and hamsters. The hybrid cell panel is produced by collecting hybrid cell lines containing human chromosomes, identified by polymerase chain reaction (PCR) screening with primers specific to the human sequence of interest as the hybridization probe. The human chromosome would be presented in all of the cell lines.

There are different approaches to producing low-resolution physical mapping, including chromosome-mediated gene transfer and irradiation fusion gene transfer which generate the hybrid cell panel. Chromosome-mediated gene transfer is a process that coprecipitates human chromosome fragments with calcium phosphate onto the cell line, leading to a stable transformation of recipient chromosomes retaining human chromosomes ranging in size from 1 to 50 mega base pairs. Irradiation fusion gene transfer produces radiation hybrids which contain the human sequence of interest and a random set of other human chromosome fragments. Markers from fragments of human chromosome in radiation hybrids give cross-reactivity patterns, which are further analyzed to generate a radiation hybrid map by ordering the markers and breakpoints. This provides evidence on whether the markers are located on the same human chromosome fragment, and hence the order of gene sequence.

== High-resolution mapping ==
High-resolution physical mapping could resolve hundreds of kilobases to a single nucleotide of DNA. A major technique to map such large DNA regions is high resolution FISH mapping, which could be achieved by the hybridization of probes to extended interphase chromosomes or artificially extended chromatin. Since their hierarchic structure is less condensed comparing to prometaphase and metaphase chromosomes, the standard in situ hybridization target, a high resolution of physical mapping could be produced.

FISH mapping using interphase chromosome is a conventional in situ method to map DNA sequences from 50 to 500 kilobases, which are mainly syntenic DNA clones. However, naturally extended chromosomes might be folded back and produces alternative physical map orders. As a result, statistical analysis is necessary to generate the accurate map order of interphase chromosomes.

If artificially stretched chromatin is used instead, mapping resolutions could be over 700 kilobases. In order to produce extended chromosomes on a slide, direct visual hybridization (DIRVISH) is often carried out, that cells are lysed by detergent to allow DNA released into the solution to flow to the other end of the slide. An example of high resolution FISH mapping using stretched chromatin is extended chromatin fiber (ECF) FISH. The method suggests the order of desired regions on the DNA sequence by analyzing the partial overlaps and gaps between yeast artificial chromosomes (YACs). Eventually, the linear sequence of the interested DNA regions could be determined. One more to note is that if metaphase chromosome is used in FISH mapping, the resolution resulted will be very poor, which is to be classified to low-resolution mapping rather than a high-resolution mapping.

== Restriction site mapping ==
Restriction mapping is a top-down strategy that divides a chromosome target into finer regions. Restriction enzymes are used to digest a chromosome and produce an ordered set of DNA fragments. It involves genomic fragments of the target rather than cloned fragments in the library. They will be pinned to probes from the genomic library that are chosen randomly for detection purpose. The lengths of the fragments are measured by electrophoresis, which can be used to deduce their distance along the map according to the restriction site, the markers of a physical map. The progress involves combinatorial algorithms.

During the progress, a chromosome is obtained from a hybrid cell and cut at rare restriction site to produce large fragments. The fragments will be separated by size and undergo hybridization, forming the macrorestriction map and different contiguous blocks (i.e. contigs). To ensure the fragments are linked, linking clones with the same rare cutting sites at the large fragments can be used.

After producing the low-resolution map, the fragments can be cut into smaller sections by restriction nucleases for further analysis to produce a map with higher resolution. PFG fractionation can be used for separation and purification of the fragments generated for small genome.

Through different digestion approaches, different types of DNA fragments are produced. The variation in types of fragments might affect the calculation result.

=== Double digestion ===
This technique uses two restriction enzymes and a combination of the two enzymes for digestion separately. It assumes that complete digestion occurs at each restriction site. The lengths of the DNA fragments are measured and used for ordering of fragments by computation. This approach has easier experimental handling, but more difficult in terms of the combinatorial problem required for mapping.

=== Partial digestion ===
This technique uses one restriction enzyme to digest the desired DNA in separated experiments with different durations of exposure. The extent of digestion for the fragments differs. DNA methylation is a technique that prevents the reaction from being completed at cutting sites. This method must be done more carefully, but its mathematical problem can be easily solved by exponential algorithm.

== Sequencing by clones ==
Using clones to generate a physical map is a bottom-up approach with fairly high resolution. It uses the existing cloned fragments in genomic libraries to form contigs. Through cloning the partially digested fragments generated by bacterial transformation, the immortal clones with overlapping regions of the genome, which will be examined by fingerprinting methods and stored in the libraries, are produced. During sequencing process, the clones are randomly selected and placed on a set of microtitre plates randomly. They will be fingerprinted by different methods. To ensure there is a minimum set of clones that form one config for a genome (i.e. tiling path), the library used will have five to ten times redundancy. However, such techniques might produce unknown gaps in the map produced or result in saturation in clones eventually.

== Application ==
Physical mapping is a technique to complete the sequencing of a genome. Ongoing projects that determine DNA base pair sequences, namely the Human Genome Project, give knowledge on the order of nucleotide and allow further investigation to answer genetic questions, particularly the association between the target sequence and the development of traits. From the individual DNA sequence isolated and mapped in physical mapping, it could provide information on the transcription and translation process during development of organisms, hence identifying the specific function of the gene and associated traits produced. As a result of understanding the expression and regulation of the genes, potential new treatments can be developed to alter protein expression patterns in specific tissues. Moreover, if the location and sequence of disease genes are identified, medical advice can be given to potential patients who are the carrier the disease gene, with reference to the knowledge of the gene function and products.
