= Li Ding =

Computational cancer biologist

- Education: Fudan University; University of Utah
- Scientific career
- Workplaces: Washington University in St. Louis
- Thesis: The molecular cloning, characterization, and regulation of diacylglycerol kinases (1998)
- Website: dinglab.wustl.edu

Li Ding is the David English Smith Distinguished Professor of Medicine at Washington University School of Medicine. She is known for the development of multiple computational tools now commonly used in cancer biology research, including VarScan, HotSpot3D, and BreakDancer.

== Education ==
Ding obtained her Bachelor of Science degree in biology from Fudan University in 1991. She moved to the United States and completed her Ph.D. in biochemistry in 1998 at University of Utah. She did her post-doctoral research in Stanford University from 1998 until 2000.

She worked at Incyte Genomics for two years before joining the Genome Institute at Washington University in St. Louis in 2002. As of 2023, she is the David English Smith Distinguished Professor of Medicine at Washington University in St. Louis.

== Research ==
Ding is known for her work in using computational tools in cancer research and has collaborated frequently with David Fenyő, Timothy J. Ley, Matthew Meyerson, and Michael Christopher Wendl. Her research has identified genes and gene mutations that play a role in cancer.
