= Ramesh K. Agarwal =

American academic

- Born: 1947 (age 78–79); Mainpuri, Uttar Pradesh, India
- Awards: Clarence (Kelly) Johnson Aerospace Vehicle and Design Award; Reed Aeronautics Award
- Scientific career
- Fields: Computational Fluid Dynamics, Computational Aeroacoustics
- Thesis: Improvement of Series with Applications to Fluid-Mechanics (1975)
- Doctoral advisor: Milton Van Dyke
- Doctoral students: Michael Wendl

Ramesh K. Agarwal is the William Palm Professor of Engineering in the McKelvey School of Engineering at Washington University in St. Louis. He is also the director of Aerospace Engineering Program, Aerospace Research and Education Center and Computational Fluid Dynamics Laboratory at WashU. From 1994 to 2001, he was the Sam Bloomfield Distinguished Professor and the executive director of the National Institute for Aviation Research at Wichita State University. Agarwal received Ph.D in Aeronautical Sciences from Stanford University in 1975, M.S. in Aeronautical Engineering from the University of Minnesota in 1969 and B.S. in Mechanical Engineering from Indian Institute of Technology, Kharagpur, India in 1968.

== Research work ==
Agarwal has worked mostly in computational simulation of fluid flows. He developed a third-order upwind scheme in 1981 for the numerical integration of Navier-Stokes equations and did some of the early calculations of transonic wing-body interactions for aircraft. He has also worked in control systems and numerical simulation of carbon sequestration. He also proposed the Wray-Agarwal one-equation turbulence model in 2015 which is a linear eddy viscosity model, derived from a k–omega turbulence model closure.

== Recognition ==
Agarwal has been honored with the Reed Aeronautics Award and is a fellow of several professional and honorary societies, including the Royal Aeronautical Society, American Association for the Advancement of Science, American Physical Society, and the Institute of Electrical and Electronics Engineers.
