= Gordon G. Grose =

Gordon Glen Grose (March 21, 1925 - March 11, 1993) was an engineer at the McDonnell-Douglas Corporation. He won the Wright Brothers Medal in 1974 with Michael J. Wendl, J. L. Porter, and Ralph Pruitt for a paper discussing future aircraft designs that integrate fly-by-wire controls with engine inlets/nozzles and advanced pilot displays.

== Biography ==
Grose attended Indiana Technical University, graduating with BS in aerospace engineering, after which he joined Chance Vought in 1945. In 1948 he went to work for McDonnell Aircraft as a staff aerodynamics engineer. He eventually managed research projects in flight mechanics and external aerodynamics and later worked on communication performance during atmospheric reentry, which was one of the critical problems in America's emerging space program.

== Awards ==
- Wright Brothers Medal 1974
