= John Zaborszky =

Hungarian control theorist (1914–2008)

- Born: May 13, 1914; Budapest, Austria-Hungary
- Died: February 11, 2008 (aged 93); St. Louis, Missouri
- Education: Royal Hungarian Technological University
- Awards: Richard E. Bellman Control Heritage Award (1986)
- Scientific career
- Fields: Control theory
- Workplaces: Washington University in St. Louis (1956–2008) Missouri University of Science and Technology
- Notable students: Michael Wendl

John Zaborszky (May 13, 1914 – February 11, 2008) was a noted Hungarian-born applied mathematician and a professor in the Department of systems science and mathematics, Washington University in St. Louis. He received the Richard E. Bellman Control Heritage Award in 1986. He was elected to the National Academy of Engineering in 1984.

== Biography ==
Zaborszky earned a master's degree and PhD in 1937 and 1943, respectively, "under auspices of the Regent of Hungary" from the Technical University of Budapest. He continued as a docent at that institution and was chief engineer of the city's municipal power system before emigrating to the United States in 1947. He was an assistant professor at UMR and in 1954 moved to St. Louis to join Washington University. In 1974, he founded and was first chairman of the Systems Science Department. He was the 1970 President of the IEEE Control Systems Society and he received its Distinguished Member Award in 1983. He was an IEEE Fellow and was elected to Eta Kappa Nu (ΗΚΝ).
