= V. Ralph Pruitt =

V. Ralph Pruitt (born July 31, 1936) was an engineer at McDonnell Douglas who won the Wright Brothers Medal in 1974 with Michael J. Wendl, Gordon G. Grose, and J. L. Porter for a paper discussing future aircraft designs that integrate fly-by-wire controls with engine inlets/nozzles and advanced pilot displays.

== Biography ==
Pruitt attended Oklahoma State, graduating with a BS in aerospace engineering and later earned a master's degree in computer science from the University of Missouri. His engineering career spanned work in the design, development, and operational testing of aircraft and spacecraft systems. He was also trained as an aircraft accident investigator and was the director of the systems safety program during the design and development of the F-15 Eagle.

== Awards ==
- Wright Brothers Medal 1974
