= Radiation hybrid mapping =

Radiation hybrid mapping (also known as RH mapping) is a technique for mapping mammalian chromosomes.

Radiation hybrid mapping consists of several steps. A radiation hybrid is "a cell or organism that contains fragments of chromosomes from a second organism". Radiation hybrids are generated by using X-rays to randomly break chromosomes into fragments, then implanting the fragments into non-irradiated rodent cells, which replicate and thus clone the chromosomes.

Then these clones are analyzed for the presence of certain DNA markers. If two given DNA markers are far apart on the initial chromosome, then it is likely that they will appear in distinct fragments. The frequency of the separation of the markers into different fragments is used to estimate the chromosomal distance between them. RH mapping has lower resolution than optical mapping, but is still of high enough resolution to be valuable. For example, the RH procedure was used to map 14 DNA probes from a region of human chromosome 21 spanning 20 megabase pairs. Radiation hybrid mapping was also used in constructing early physical maps of the human genome.
