= Sulston score =

The Sulston score is an equation used in DNA mapping to numerically assess the likelihood that a given "fingerprint" similarity between two DNA clones is merely a result of chance. Used as such, it is a test of statistical significance. That is, low values imply that similarity is significant, suggesting that two DNA clones overlap one another and that the given similarity is not just a chance event. The name is an eponym that refers to John Sulston by virtue of his being the lead author of the paper that first proposed the equation's use.

== The overlap problem in mapping ==
Each clone in a DNA mapping project has a "fingerprint", i.e. a set of DNA fragment lengths inferred from (1) enzymatically digesting the clone, (2) separating these fragments on a gel, and (3) estimating their lengths based on gel location. For each pairwise clone comparison, one can establish how many lengths from each set match-up. Cases having at least 1 match indicate that the clones might overlap because matches may represent the same DNA. However, the underlying sequences for each match are not known. Consequently, two fragments whose lengths match may still represent different sequences. In other words, matches do not conclusively indicate overlaps. The problem is instead one of using matches to probabilistically classify overlap status.

=== Mathematical scores in overlap assessment ===
Biologists have used a variety of means (often in combination) to discern clone overlaps in DNA mapping projects. While many are biological, i.e. looking for shared markers, others are basically mathematical, usually adopting probabilistic and/or statistical approaches.

== Sulston score exposition ==
The Sulston score is rooted in the concepts of Bernoulli and binomial processes, as follows. Consider two clones, $\alpha$ and $\beta$, having $m$ and $n$ measured fragment lengths, respectively, where $m \ge n$. That is, clone $\alpha$ has at least as many fragments as clone $\beta$, but usually more. The Sulston score is the probability that at least $h$ fragment lengths on clone $\beta$ will be matched by any combination of lengths on $\alpha$. Intuitively, we see that, at most, there can be $n$ matches. Thus, for a given comparison between two clones, one can measure the statistical significance of a match of $h$ fragments, i.e. how likely it is that this match occurred simply as a result of random chance. Very low values would indicate a significant match that is highly unlikely to have arisen by pure chance, while higher values would suggest that the given match could be just a coincidence.

Derivation of the Sulston Score
One of the basic assumptions is that fragments are uniformly distributed on a gel, i.e. a fragment has an equal likelihood of appearing anywhere on the gel. Since gel position is an indicator of fragment length, this assumption is equivalent to presuming that the fragment lengths are uniformly distributed. The measured location of any fragment $x$, has an associated error tolerance of $\pm t$, so that its true location is only known to lie within the segment $x \pm t$.

In what follows, let us refer to individual fragment lengths simply as lengths. Consider a specific length $j$ on clone $\beta$ and a specific length $i$ on clone $\alpha$. These two lengths are arbitrarily selected from their respective sets $i \in \{1, 2, \dots, m\}$ and $j \in \{1, 2, \dots, n\}$. We assume that the gel location of fragment $j$ has been determined and we want the probability of the event $E_{ij}$ that the location of fragment $i$ will match that of $j$. Geometrically, $i$ will be declared to match $j$ if it falls inside the window of size $2 t$ around $j$. Since fragment $i$ could occur anywhere in the gel of length $G$, we have $P \langle E_{ij} \rangle = 2 t / G$. The probability that $i$ does not match $j$ is simply the complement, i.e. $P \langle E_{i,j}^C \rangle = 1 - 2 t / G$, since it must either match or not match.

Now, let us expand this to compute the probability that no length on clone $\alpha$ matches the single particular length $j$ on clone $\beta$. This is simply the intersection of all individual trials $i \in \{1, 2, \dots, m\}$ where the event $E_{i,j}^C$ occurs, i.e. $P \langle E_{1,j}^C \cap E_{2,j}^C \cap \cdots \cap E_{m,j}^C \rangle$. This can be restated verbally as: length 1 on clone $\alpha$ does not match length $j$ on clone $\beta$ and length 2 does not match length $j$ and length 3 does not match, etc. Since each of these trials is assumed to be independent, the probability is simply

$$P \langle E_{1,j}^C \rangle \times P \langle E_{2,j}^C \rangle \times \cdots \times P \langle E_{m,j}^C \rangle = \left(1 - 2 t / G\right)^m.$$

Of course, the actual event of interest is the complement: i.e. there is not "no matches". In other words, the probability of one or more matches is $p = 1 - \left(1 - 2 t / G\right)^m$. Formally, $p$ is the probability that at least one band on clone $\alpha$ matches band $j$ on clone $\beta$.

This event is taken as a Bernoulli trial having a "success" (matching) probability of $p$ for band $j$. However, we want to describe the process over all the bands on clone $\beta$. Since $p$ is constant, the number of matches is distributed binomially. Given $h$ observed matches, the Sulston score $S$ is simply the probability of obtaining at least $h$ matches by chance according to

$$S = \sum_{j=h}^n C_{n,j} p^j (1-p)^{n-j},$$

where $C_{n,j}$ are binomial coefficients.

== Mathematical refinement ==
In a 2005 paper, Michael Wendl gave an example showing that the assumption of independent trials is not valid. So, although the traditional Sulston score does indeed represent a probability distribution, it is not actually the distribution characteristic of the fingerprint problem. Wendl went on to give the general solution for this problem in terms of the Bell polynomials, showing the traditional score overpredicts P-values by orders of magnitude. (P-values are very small in this problem, so we are talking, for example, about probabilities on the order of 10×10^{−14} versus 10×10^{−12}, the latter Sulston value being 2 orders of magnitude too high.) This solution provides a basis for determining when a problem has sufficient information content to be treated by the probabilistic approach and is also a general solution to the birthday problem of 2 types.

A disadvantage of the exact solution is that its evaluation is computationally intensive and, in fact, is not feasible for comparing large clones. Some fast approximations for this problem have been proposed.

== See also ==
- FPC: a widely used fingerprint mapping program that utilizes the Sulston Score
