= Michael J. Wendl =

American aerospace engineer (1934–2025)

Michael J Wendl
- Born: June 6, 1934
- Died: May 22, 2025 (aged 90); St. Louis, Missouri, U.S.
- Education: Washington University in St. Louis
- Awards: Wright Brothers Medal (1974)
- Scientific career
- Fields: Missile guidance Guidance, navigation, and control
- Workplaces: McDonnell Douglas; Boeing
- Thesis: A Describing Function Study of a Single Stage Open-Center Hot Gas Servo Valve (1961)
- Academic advisors: John Zaborszky

Michael John Wendl (June 6, 1934 – May 22, 2025) was an American engineer who worked at the McDonnell-Douglas Corporation, mainly in the area of aerospace control. He is noted primarily as one of the early developers of terrain following technology and a proponent of incorporating energy management theory into the design of fighter aircraft. He won the Wright Brothers Medal in 1974 with Ralph Pruitt, Gordon G. Grose, and J. L. Porter for a paper discussing future aircraft designs that integrate fly-by-wire controls with engine inlets/nozzles and advanced pilot displays.

== Biography ==
Wendl attended Washington University in St. Louis, graduating with BS in Electrical Engineering (EE) from the School of Engineering and Applied Science in 1958. He did his graduate work at the same institution under John Zaborszky, working as an instructor for physics and EE courses and completing a thesis on the control of servos for heated gases in 1961.

Wendl joined McDonnell Aircraft working in guidance and flight control systems, which at this time were topics experiencing rapid advancements. The company had expanded its efforts into a vigorous research and development program to support its aircraft and missile programs and Wendl's efforts focused on propulsion/control coupling, energy management, fly-by-wire controls, terrain following, and control augmentation. In 1968, he co-authored a paper documenting the development of vertical terrain-following capability based on the General Electric 666A actuator system as applied to fighter-bomber aircraft, in particular the F-4.

In the late 1960s, McDonnell was engaged in the fierce USAF F-X program competition for an aircraft that would counter the Soviet Mig-25. It was awarded the contract for what would become the F-15 Eagle in 1969. Wendl directed the fuel system design and development program and later contributed to various engineering refinements to subsequent models of the Eagle.

Wendl is of ethnic German heritage, a cultural leader within the German-American community, and is the father of Michael Christopher Wendl.

Wendl died on May 22, 2025, at the age of 90.
