= Jared Roach =

American biologist

- Roach in 2011
- Citizenship: United States
- Education: University of Washington; Cornell University
- Known for: Pairwise End Sequencing
- Scientific career
- Fields: Biotechnology, Genomics, Systems biology
- Workplaces: Institute for Systems Biology
- Thesis: Random subcloning, pairwise end sequencing, and the molecular evolution of the vertebrate trypsinogens (1998)
- Doctoral advisor: Leroy Hood
- Website: Profile at ISB

Jared C. Roach is an American biologist who invented the pairwise end sequencing strategy while a graduate student at the University of Washington.

== Education and early career ==
Roach attended Cornell University, where he received his Bachelor of Science in biology in 1990. He then attended the University of Washington, where he received his PhD in immunology in 1998, and his MD in 1999. He trained in internal medicine at the University of Utah through 2001.

== Career ==
Starting as a graduate student in the 1990s, Roach worked on the Human Genome Project from its early days through its conclusion in 2003. He invented pairwise end-sequencing while a graduate student in Leroy Hood's laboratory.

Roach was a senior fellow at the department of molecular biotechnology at the University of Washington from 1999 to 2000. In 2001, he became a research scientist at the Institute for Systems Biology.

In 2009, Roach was first author on a project which sequenced the whole genomes of a family of four, including two children affected by Miller syndrome and primary ciliary dyskinesia. This effort identified the cause of Miller syndrome, a simple recessive Mendelian disorder. It also produced the first complete whole-chromosomal parental haplotypes in humans. Parental haplotyping is the process of assigning all the variants in the genome to paternal and maternal chromosomes. The team applied these techniques to identify genetic mutations related to several genetic diseases, including genes for Adams–Oliver syndrome, alternating hemiplegia of childhood, certain subtypes of epilepsy, palmoplantar keratoderma, and Fanconi anemia.

From 2007 to 2009, he was scientific director of the High-Throughput Analysis Core (HAC) laboratory at Seattle Children's Hospital. Since 2009, he has been a senior research scientist at the Institute for Systems Biology. Roach's group currently applies systems biology to complex genetic diseases, including Alzheimer's disease.

In 2020, Roach was involved in a project to map out the molecular phylogenetics of Washington state's initial SARS-CoV-2 outbreak.

== Selected publications ==
Roach has authored more than 70 publications with over 9000 citations.

- Aparicio, S.; Chapman, J.; Stupka, E.; Putnam, N.; Chia, J. M.; Dehal, P.; Christoffels, A.; Rash, S.; Hoon, S.; Smit, A.; Gelpke, M. D.; Roach, J.; Oh, T.; Ho, I. Y.; Wong, M.; Detter, C.; Verhoef, F.; Predki, P.; Tay, A.; Lucas, S.; Richardson, P.; Smith, S. F.; Clark, M. S.; Edwards, Y. J.; Doggett, N.; Zharkikh, A.; Tavtigian, S. V.; Pruss, D.; Barnstead, M.; et al. (2002). "Whole-genome shotgun assembly and analysis of the genome of Fugu rubripes". Science. 297 (5585): 1301–10. Bibcode:2002Sci...297.1301A. doi:10.1126/science.1072104. PMID 12142439. S2CID 10310355.
- Roach, J. C.; Glusman, G.; Rowen, L.; Kaur, A.; Purcell, M. K.; Smith, K. D.; Hood, L. E.; Aderem, A. (2005). "The evolution of vertebrate Toll-like receptors". Proceedings of the National Academy of Sciences of the United States of America. 102 (27): 9577–82. Bibcode:2005PNAS..102.9577R. doi:10.1073/pnas.0502272102. PMC 1172252. PMID 15976025.
- Roach, J. C.; Boysen, C.; Wang, K.; Hood, L. (1995). "Pairwise end sequencing: A unified approach to genomic mapping and sequencing". Genomics. 26 (2): 345–53. doi:10.1016/0888-7543(95)80219-c. PMID 7601461.
- Roach, J. C.; Glusman, G.; Smit, A. F.; Huff, C. D.; Hubley, R.; Shannon, P. T.; Rowen, L.; Pant, K. P.; Goodman, N.; Bamshad, M.; Shendure, J.; Drmanac, R.; Jorde, L. B.; Hood, L.; Galas, D. J. (2010). "Analysis of genetic inheritance in a family quartet by whole-genome sequencing". Science. 328 (5978): 636–9. Bibcode:2010Sci...328..636R. doi:10.1126/science.1186802. PMC 3037280. PMID 20220176.
- Roach, J. C.; Glusman, G.; Hubley, R.; Montsaroff, S. Z.; Holloway, A. K.; Mauldin, D. E.; Srivastava, D.; Garg, V.; Pollard, K. S.; Galas, D. J.; Hood, L.; Smit, A. F. (2011). "Chromosomal haplotypes by genetic phasing of human families". American Journal of Human Genetics. 89 (3): 382–97. doi:10.1016/j.ajhg.2011.07.023. PMC 3169815. PMID 21855840.
- Roach, J. C. (1995). "Random subcloning". Genome Research. 5 (5): 464–73. doi:10.1101/gr.5.5.464. PMID 8808467.
