= Bob Waterston =

Robert Waterston
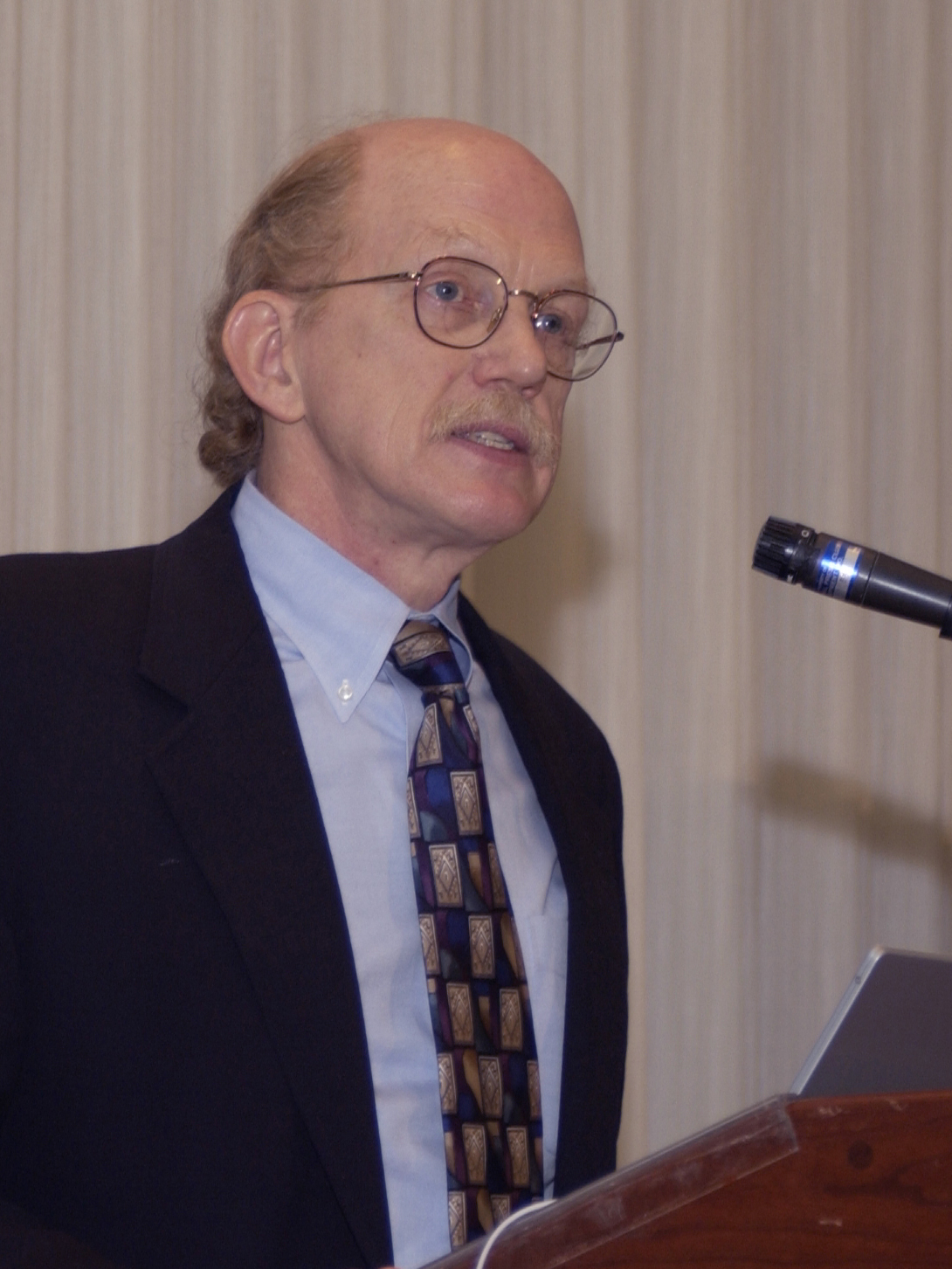
- Born: Robert Hugh Waterston; September 17, 1943 (age 82); Detroit, Michigan
- Education: Princeton University; University of Chicago
- Known for: Caenorhabditis elegans' Genome Sequencing Human Genome Project
- Awards: George W. Beadle Award (2000); Gairdner Award (2002); Dan David Prize (2002); Alfred P. Sloan, Jr. Prize (2002); Gruber Prize in Genetics (2005)
- Scientific career
- Fields: Genome Science, Cell Biology, Genetics
- Workplaces: Washington University in St. Louis; University of Washington

Robert Hugh "Bob" Waterston, (born September 17, 1943) is an American biologist. He is best known for his work on the Human Genome Project, for which he was a pioneer along with John Sulston.

== Education ==
Waterston attended Princeton as an undergraduate where he majored in engineering; he wrote his senior dissertation on the plays of Eugene O'Neill. While on a visit to Germany he took courses in biology – in German – and returned to take up a place at the school of medicine of the University of Chicago. In 1972, he acquired both MD and PhD degrees, with his thesis focusing on immunology.

== Career ==
Following a postdoctoral position in the laboratory of Sydney Brenner at the MRC Laboratory of Molecular Biology (LMB) in Cambridge, he joined the Washington University School of Medicine as assistant professor of anatomy and neurobiology in 1976. A few years later, he switched to the Department of Genetics, where by 1991 he became chair.

In the mid-1980s he made a sabbatical visit to the LMB, ostensibly to continue his work with Brenner. However, the only space available was in the room where John Sulston and Alan Coulson were beginning to map the genome of the nematode worm C. elegans. Waterston joined them, and after his return to St. Louis, the worm map became a collaborative project between the two labs.

In 1989, one of the first Human Genome Project grants went to Waterston and Sulston to begin the sequencing of the worm genome. They were so successful that at the same time that the Wellcome Trust established the Sanger Centre (now the Wellcome Sanger Institute) with Sulston at its head, Waterston received funding from the National Human Genome Research Institute to undertake large-scale human sequencing at his Washington University lab. The partnership became the first to complete the sequence of a multicellular organism when the worm genome was published in December 1998. The partnership went on to have leading roles in the sequencing of both the mouse and chimpanzee genomes.

In January 2003, Waterston moved from St. Louis to become the new William Gates III Endowed Chair in Biomedical Science, Professor and Chair of the Department of Genome Sciences, at the University of Washington in Seattle. Waterston served in his position as chair of Genome Sciences until 2018.

Waterston has always been committed to the free release of scientific information, and was an influential voice in establishing the Bermuda Principles on the public release of DNA sequence data in 1996.

== Awards and honors ==
Waterston and Sulston have jointly won numerous awards for their scientific work and their support for the scientific community, including the Gairdner Award, the General Motors prize, the Alfred P. Sloan Award, the Dan David Prize and the George W. Beadle Award of the Genetics Society of America. In 2005, Waterston received the Gruber Prize in Genetics.
