= Sternberg =

Sternberg may refer to:

== Places ==
=== Austria ===
- Burgruine Sternberg, a castle ruin in Carinthia

=== Czech Republic ===
- Šternberk (German: Sternberg), a town with an eponymous castle and seat of the mediæval County of Sternberg
- Český Šternberk (German: Böhmisch Sternberg), a market town
  - Český Šternberk Castle, a castle

=== Germany ===
- Sternberg, Mecklenburg-Vorpommern, a town
- Sternberg, a castle in Extertal, North Rhine-Westphalia
- Sternberg, a castle in Sulzdorf an der Lederhecke, Bavaria
- County of Sternberg, a Middle Age county, nowadays part of Lippe

=== Poland ===
- Torzym (German: Sternberg in der Neumark), a town

== Others ==
- Sternberg (surname)
- Von Sternberg, surname
- Counts of Sternberg (Šternberkové), Bohemian nobility
- Sternberg (crater) (or Shternberg), an eroded lunar impact crater on the Moon's far side
- Sternberg Astronomical Institute, a research institution in Moscow, Russia
- Sternberg Centre for Judaism, in London
- Sternberg peer review controversy
- Reed–Sternberg cell

== See also ==
- Starnberg, a city in Bavaria, Germany
- Sternburg, a brand of German beer
- Sternberger, a surname
