= Sternberg (surname) =

Sternberg is a surname. Notable people with the surname include:

== Persons ==
- Counts of Sternberg (Šternberkové), Bohemian nobility
- Ben-Zion Sternberg (1894–1962), Zionist statesman
- Brian Sternberg (1943–2013), American pole vaulter, world record holder
- Charles Hazelius Sternberg (1850–1943), American paleontologist
- Charles Mortram Sternberg (1885–1981), American paleontologist
- Dov Sternberg, American karateka
- Jonas Sternberg (1894–1969), American film director
- Elf Sternberg (born 1966), American online erotica author
- Erich Walter Sternberg (1891–1974), German-born Israeli composer
- Eugene Sternberg (1915–2005), Hungarian-born American architect
- George F. Sternberg (1883–1969), American naturalist and paleontologist
- George Miller Sternberg (1838–1915), American bacteriologist and physician
- Jacob Sternberg (1890–1973), Yiddish writer and theatrical director
- Jacques Sternberg (1923–2006), French-language writer of science fiction and fantastique
- Janek Sternberg (born 1992), German footballer
- Jonathan Sternberg (1919–2018), American conductor
- Josef von Sternberg (also Jonas Sternberg, 1894–1969), Austrian-American film director
- Kaspar Maria von Sternberg (1761–1838), Bohemian palaeontologist (The standard botanical author abbreviation Sternb. is applied to species he described)
- Lev Sternberg (1861–1927), Ukrainian ethnologist
- Liam Sternberg (born c. 1950), American songwriter and producer
- Josef von Sternberg (1894–1969), American film director
- Marvin J. Sternberg (1912–1994), justice of the Kentucky Supreme Court
- Maya Sternberg, American statistician
- Meir Sternberg (born 1944), Israeli biblical scholar
- Nat Sternberg (1942–1995), American molecular biologist
- Ricardo Sternberg (born 1948), Brazilian-born Canadian poet
- Richard Sternberg (fl. 1990s–2020s), American scientist and intelligent design proponent
- Robert Sternberg (born 1949), American psychologist
- Freiherr Roman von Ungern-Sternberg (1886–1921), Baltic German-Russian lieutenant-general
- Rudy Sternberg, Baron Plurenden (1917–1978), Austro-British businessman
- Saul Sternberg (fl. 1950s–2020s), American cognitive psychologist
- Shlomo Sternberg (1936–2024), Harvard mathematician
- Sir Sigmund Sternberg (1921–2016), British philanthropist
- Stephen Sternberg (1920–2021), American surgical pathologist
- Stuart Sternberg (born 1959), American owner of the Tampa Bay Rays
- Theodor Sternberg (1878–1950), German philosopher

=== Other spelling ===
- David Shterenberg (1881–1948), Ukrainian-born Russian painter and graphic artist
- Pavel Karlovich Shternberg (1865–1920), Russian astronomer and Bolshevik revolutionary
- Hermann Speck von Sternburg (1852–1908), German diplomat
- Janet Sternburg (born 1943), American writer and poet
- Maximilian Speck von Sternburg (1776–1856), German wool merchant and art collector

== See also ==
- von Sternberg, Sternberger
- Star of Sternberg
- Sternberg (disambiguation)
