= Shternberg =

Shternberg is a surname, a variant of Sternberg, either a Yiddish spelling or a transliteration from Russian. Notable people with this surname include:

- Pavel Shternberg (1865-1920), Russian astronomer, Bolshevik and revolutionary
