= Zdeslav of Sternberg =

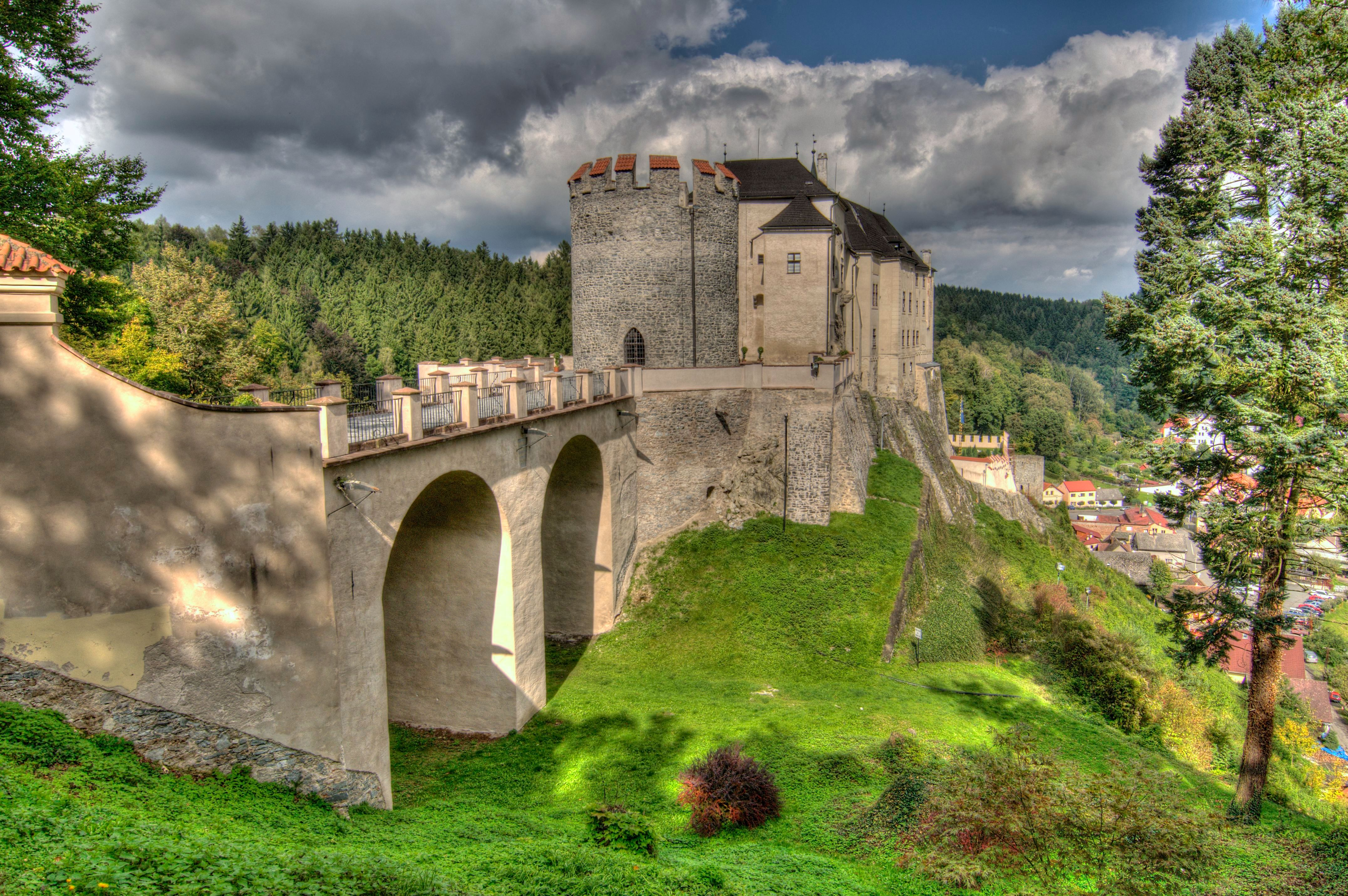
Castle of Český Šternberk today, founded by Zdeslav before 1263

Zdeslav, son of Diviš, was the head of the House of Sternberg in the mid-13th century.

Zdeslav held some lands in the March of Moravia, where he founded the town of Český Šternberk and its castle. Although first mentioned in 1269, the castle seems to have been founded around 1240. One of two castles founded by Zdeslav, it subsequently became the seat of the house.

Zdeslav is the only known member of the family from the time of the Mongol incursion of 1241. He is not recorded as participating the defence of Olomouc when it was besieged by the Hungarians during the War of the Babenberg Succession in 1253, but he was at Olomouc shortly after the end of the siege in the entourage of Margrave Ottokar of Moravia on 5 August 1253. He was a leading member of Ottokar's court.

Centuries later, Zdeslav's son, Jaroslav, who was probably too young to take part in military action in 1253, was converted into a legendary hero who defended Olomouc from the Mongols. Jaroslav is first mentioned in sources of the year 1263, which is also the last year in which Zdeslav is known to have been alive.
