= Zdeněk Sternberg =

Czech nobleman (1923–2021)

Count Zdeněk Filip Maria Emanuel Jiří Ignatius von Sternberg (August 15, 1923 – January 19, 2021) was a descendant of the ancient aristocratic Šternberk family and the owner of Český Šternberk Castle and Březina Castle. He was the second child and eldest son of the Count George of Sternberg (December 10, 1888, Prague – July 27, 1965, Bruneck) and his wife (married April 6, 1921, Chotělice) Countess Kunigunde of Mensdorff-Pouilly (January 11, 1899 – November 19, 1989). He died on January 19, 2021. He was a Medal of Merit recipient.

== Early life and education ==
He was born on August 15, 1923, in Prague as the second child and eldest son of the Count of George of Sternberg (December 10, 1888, Prague – July 27, 1965, Bruneck) and his wife (married April 6, 1921, Chotělice) Countess Kunhuta of Mensdorff-Pouilly (January 11, 1899 – November 19, 1989). He had eight siblings (four sisters and four brothers). Until he was 14, he was taught at Český Šternberk Castle by a home teacher, and he took exams at the municipal school in Český Šternberk, and later at the Archbishop's Grammar School in Prague-Bubeneč. In the school year 1938/1939 he joined the quartet at the Vančur grammar school in Smíchov, where he graduated during the war. He lived in an apartment in Malá Strana. He then befriended Josef Czernin (August 9, 1924, Prague – April 13, 2015), who lived in Thunovská Street.

== Adult life ==
=== Early career and involvement in protests ===
After graduating, he started working as a clerk in the Central Union of Crafts in the Koruna Palace on Wenceslas Square. There, his task was to organize the repair of damage after the Allied air raids. After World War II, he enrolled at the Faculty of Law of Charles University in Prague, where he studied until 1949, but was not admitted to graduation for political reasons. On Wednesday, February 25, 1948, he took part in a march of students to Prague Castle to President Edvard Beneš, who protested against the communist approach. He actively participated not only in the second but also in the third resistance. He helped organize the illegal crossing of borders and the departure of his siblings and friends to the West. He joined the war on October 1, 1950. Basic training with the artillery regiment in Litoměřice lasted only a few weeks, then he was transferred to the Auxiliary Technical Battalion. For five years, first as part of the PTP and later as a civilian he worked as a miner at the President Gottwald Mine in Hrdlovka near Duchcov and later at Velkodole Čs. army in Karviná. From 1956 he worked for twelve years as a set designer and deputy stage master at the Musical Theater in Karlín.

=== Marriage ===
On May 10, 1955, he married Elizabeth Hruba-Gelenj. Hansobald Czernin married them in the Church of St. Nicholas on Lesser Town Square in Prague. They went on a train journey from Prague to the Jeseníky Mountains, spending the night at the Grandhotel in Hradec Králové. On October 29, 1956, their son Filip was born.

=== Exile ===
Between 1957 and 1961, he acted under duress as a StB agent, without, however, telling them anything useful, so she eventually canceled her cooperation with him. After the occupation of Czechoslovakia by the Warsaw Pact troops in 1968, he emigrated with his wife and son, first to Westphalia to his brothers and then to Vienna, where he worked in a food concern from 1 December 1968; from Procurator (1973) developed into Deputy General Manager. After going into exile, he was sentenced to three years in prison unconditionally. He asked for a pardon and he was pardoned in 1982.

=== Return and later life ===
After the Velvet Revolution in 1989, he returned to Czechoslovakia and in 1992, as a pensioner, he restituted Český Šternberk Castle and with it in its vicinity over two thousand hectares of fields and meadows (agricultural enterprise Šternov). He also restituted about two thousand hectares in the Rokycany region. He recovered and also reconstructed the hydroelectric power plant in Ratají nad Sázavou. In addition to managing his property, he also worked on the protection and promotion of Czech cultural monuments at home and abroad.

== Awards ==
On October 28, 2005, the President of the Republic, Václav Klaus, awarded him the Medal of Merit II. degrees.
