= Betz Halloran =

American biostatistician

Mary Elizabeth (Betz) Halloran is an American biostatistician who works as a professor of biostatistics, professor of epidemiology, and adjunct professor of applied mathematics at the University of Washington.

== Education and career ==
Halloran studied physics and philosophy of mathematics for two years as an undergraduate at Case Western Reserve University, from 1968 to 1970, before leaving school to join the counterculture movement in San Francisco. Deciding to study medicine, she returned to school, completing a bachelor's degree in general science at the University of Oregon in 1972.

She traveled to Berlin to continue her studies at the Max Planck Institute for Molecular Genetics and the Free University of Berlin from 1973 to 1975, studied medicine at the University of Southampton in England in 1981, and completed an M.D. at the Free University of Berlin in 1983. Her goal at that time was to practice medicine in the developing world, so she continued to study tropical diseases at the Bernhard Nocht Institute for Tropical Medicine in Hamburg in 1984, and then earned a master of public health degree from Harvard University in 1985. In that program, she rekindled her interest in mathematical modeling, and she stayed at Harvard as a graduate student, earning a D.Sc. in population sciences from Harvard in 1989.

After postdoctoral research at Princeton University and Imperial College London, she joined Emory University as an assistant professor of epidemiology and biostatistics in 1989, and was promoted to full professor in 1998. At Emory, she directed the Center for AIDS Research from 2002 to 2005, and the Center for Highthroughput Experimental Design and Analysis from 2004 to 2005. She moved to the University of Washington in 2005. In 2009, she founded the Summer Institute in Statistics and Modeling in Infectious Diseases at the University of Washington, and continues to serve as its director.

== Research ==
Halloran studies causal inference and the biostatistics of infectious diseases. She is a long-term collaborator with University of Florida researcher Ira Longini, with whom she studies the spread of influenza. She has also been quoted as an expert on the mortality rates of other diseases such as ebola and cholera, and the factors influencing those rates.

With Longini and Claudio J. Struchiner, she is a co-author of the book Design and Analysis of Vaccine Studies (Springer, 2009).

== Awards and honors ==
In 1996, Halloran was elected as a fellow of the American Statistical Association, in 1997 she became a fellow of the Royal Statistical Society, and in 2009 she became a fellow of the American Association for the Advancement of Science.

In 2005 and 2006 she held the Dr. Ross Prentice Professorship of Biostatistics at the University of Washington.
