= Ira Longini =

American biostatistician

- Born: October 2, 1948 (age 77); Cincinnati, Ohio
- Education: University of Florida; University of Minnesota
- Spouse: Amy Vigilante
- Children: 2
- Scientific career
- Thesis: Optimal Control of Influenza Epidemics (1977)
- Doctoral advisor: Eugene Ackerman
- Doctoral students: Maya Sternberg

Ira M. Longini (born October 2, 1948) is an American biostatistician and infectious disease epidemiologist.

== Career ==
Longini began his career with the International Center for Medical Research and Training and the Universidad del Valle in Cali, Colombia, where he worked on tropical infectious disease problems and taught courses in biomathematics. Following that he was a professor of biostatistics at the University of Michigan, Emory University, and the University of Washington. In 2014 he is a professor of biostatistics at the University of Florida and Co-Director of the Center for Statistical and Quantitative Infectious Diseases (CSQUID), the Emerging Pathogens Institute, at the University of Florida.

=== Research ===
Longini studies stochastic processes applied to epidemiological problems. He has specialized in the mathematical and statistical theory of epidemics, which involves constructing and analyzing mathematical models of disease transmission, disease progression and the analysis of infectious disease data based on these models. He designs and analyses vaccine and infectious disease prevention trials and observational studies. He has worked on the analysis of epidemics of influenza, HIV, tuberculosis, cholera, dengue fever, malaria, rhinovirus, rotavirus, measles and other infectious agents.

Longini is also collaborating with the Department of Health and Human Services, the World Health Organization, the CDC and other public health organizations on mathematical and statistical models for the control of a possible bioterrorist attack with an infectious agent such as smallpox, and other natural infectious disease threats such as pandemic influenza or another SARS-like infectious agent.

Longini develops mathematical statistical methods to estimate the transmission and natural history of infectious diseases. These methods are then used to create mathematical models which predict infectious disease transmission and indicate methods for control with vaccines and other measures. His work on HIV helped to develop an understanding of pathogenesis and progression of HIV, including how HIV is transmitted in different rates at different stages. This work contributed to the design HIV treatments and analysis of their effectiveness. Longini extensively studied the transmission and of pandemic and interpandemic influenza and its control with antiviral agents and vaccines.

Longini investigated how infectious diseases such as influenza, cholera, typhoid and dengue could be controlled with vaccines. He has designed, analyzed and interpreted vaccine studies for many of these infectious diseases, taking into account the indirect protection that unvaccinated people receive in a population of vaccinated people. His work has helped to demonstrate how mass vaccination of school children helps to protect the entire community from influenza. This strategy is being implemented throughout the world, and could eventually lead to control of both pandemic and interpandemic influenza.

== Honors ==
Longini has won a number of awards for excellence in research, including the Howard M. Temin Award in Epidemiology for "Scientific Excellence in the Fight against HIV/AIDS," two CDC Statistical Science Awards for both "Best Theoretical and Applied Papers," and the CDC James H. Nakano Citation "for an outstanding scientific publications." He is a Fellow of the American Statistical Association and a Fellow of the American Association for the Advancement of Science.

== Selected publications ==
Longini is author or coauthor of more than 152 scientific papers and one book.

- Longini I.M., Ackerman E., Elveback L.R. (1978). "An optimization model for influenza A epidemics". Mathematical Biosciences. 38 (1–2): 141–157. doi:10.1016/0025-5564(78)90023-8.
- Longini I.M., Koopman J.S. (1982). "Household and community transmission parameters from final distributions of infections in households". Biometrics. 38: 115–126. doi:10.2307/2530294. JSTOR 2530294.
- Longini I.M., Koopman J., Monto A.S., Fox J.P. (1982). "Estimating household and community transmission parameters for influenza". American Journal of Epidemiology. 115 (5): 736–751. doi:10.1093/oxfordjournals.aje.a113356.
- Rvachev L.A., Longini I.M. (1985). "A mathematical model for the global spread of influenza". Mathematical Biosciences. 75: 3–22. doi:10.1016/0025-5564(85)90064-1.
- Horsburgh C.R., Ou C.H., Jason J., Holmberg S.D., Longini I.M.; et al. (1989). "Duration of human immunodeficiency virus infection before detection of antibody". Lancet. II (8664): 637–640. doi:10.1016/S0140-6736(89)90892-1.
- Longini I.M., Clark W.S., Byers R.H., Lemp G.F., Ward J.W., Darrow W.W., Hethcote H.W. (1989). "Statistical analysis of the stages of HIV infection using a Markov model". Statistics in Medicine. 8 (7): 831–843. doi:10.1002/sim.4780080708.
- Longini I.M. (1990). "Modeling the decline of CD+4 T‑lymphocyte counts in HIV‑infected individuals. Letter to the Editor". Journal of Acquired Immune Deficiency Syndromes. 9: 930–931.
- Jacquez J.A., Koopman J.S., Simon C.P., Longini I.M. (1994). "The role of primary infection in the epidemics of HIV infection in gay cohorts". Journal of Acquired Immune Deficiency Syndromes. 7: 1169–1184.
- Longini I.M., Halloran M.E. (1995). "AIDS: Modeling epidemic control". Science. 267 (5202): 1250–1251. Bibcode:1995Sci...267.1250L. doi:10.1126/science.7871414. PMID 7871414.
- Longini I.M., Halloran M.E. (1996). "A frailty mixture model for estimating vaccine efficacy". Applied Statistics. 45: 165–173. doi:10.2307/2986152. JSTOR 2986152.
- Longini I.M., Yunus M., Zaman K., Siddique A.K., Sack R.B., Nizam A. (2002). "Epidemic and endemic cholera trends over thirty‑three years in Bangladesh". Journal of Infectious Diseases. 186: 246–251. doi:10.1086/341206.
- Longini IM Jr, Halloran ME, Nizam A, Yang Y (2004). "Containing pandemic influenza with antiviral agents". Am J Epidemiol. 159 (7): 623–33. doi:10.1093/aje/kwh092. PMID 15033640.
- Longini IM Jr, Nizam A, Xu S, Ungchusak K, Hanshaoworakul W, Cummings DA, Halloran ME (2005). "Containing pandemic influenza at the source". Science. 309 (5737): 1083–7. Bibcode:2005Sci...309.1083L. doi:10.1126/science.1115717. PMID 16079251.
- Longini IM Jr, Nizam A, Xu S, Ungchusak K, Hanshaoworakul W, Cummings DA, Halloran ME (2005). "Containing pandemic influenza at the source". Science. 309 (5737): 1083–7. Bibcode:2005Sci...309.1083L. doi:10.1126/science.1115717. PMID 16079251.
- Halloran ME, Longini IM Jr (2006). "Public health. Community studies for vaccinating schoolchildren against influenza". Science. 311: 615–6. doi:10.1126/science.1122143. PMID 16456066.
- Germann T.C., Kadau K., Longini I.M., Macken C.A. (2006). "Mitigation strategies for pandemic influenza in the United States". Proceedings of the National Academy of Sciences. 103 (15): 5935–5940. doi:10.1073/pnas.0601266103. PMC 1458676. PMID 16585506.
- Longini IM Jr, Nizam A, Ali M, Yunus M, Shenvi N, Clemens JD (2007). "Controlling endemic cholera with oral vaccines". PLOS Med. 4 (11) e336. doi:10.1371/journal.pmed.0040336. PMC 2082648. PMID 18044983.
- Halloran M.E., Ferguson N.M., Eubank S., Longini I.M.; et al. (2008). "Modeling targeted layered containment of an influenza pandemic in the United States". Proceedings of the National Academy of Sciences. 105 (12): 4639–4644. Bibcode:2008PNAS..105.4639H. doi:10.1073/pnas.0706849105. PMC 2290797. PMID 2290797.
- Halloran, M.E., Longini, I.M. and Struchiner, C.J.: The Design and Analysis of Vaccine Studies. Springer, New York, 387 pp. (2009).
- Yang Y, Sugimoto JD, Halloran ME, Basta NE, Chao DL, Matrajt L, Potter G, Kenah E, Longini IM Jr (2009). "The transmissibility and control of pandemic influenza A (H1N1) virus". Science. 326 (5953): 729–33. Bibcode:2009Sci...326..729Y. doi:10.1126/science.1177373. PMC 2880578. PMID 19745114.
- Chao DL, Halloran ME, Longini IM Jr (2011). "Vaccination strategies for epidemic cholera in Haiti with implications for the developing world". Proc Natl Acad Sci U S A. 108 (17): 7081–5. Bibcode:2011PNAS..108.7081C. doi:10.1073/pnas.1102149108. PMC 3084143. PMID 21482756.
- Chao DL, Halstead SB, Halloran ME, Longini IM Jr (2012). "Controlling dengue with vaccines in Thailand". PLOS Negl Trop Dis. 6 (10) e1876. Bibcode:2012PNTDi...6.1876C. doi:10.1371/journal.pntd.0001876. PMC 3493390. PMID 23145197.
