= Von Sternberg =

Original Coat of arms of the Sternberg-Manderscheid family

The House of Sternberg (Czech: ze Šternberka) is one of the oldest, wealthiest, and most influential aristocratic families in the history of Bohemia (modern-day Czech Republic).

== History ==
Český Šternberk Castle; founded in 1241, the castle is still the main residence of the Sternberg family

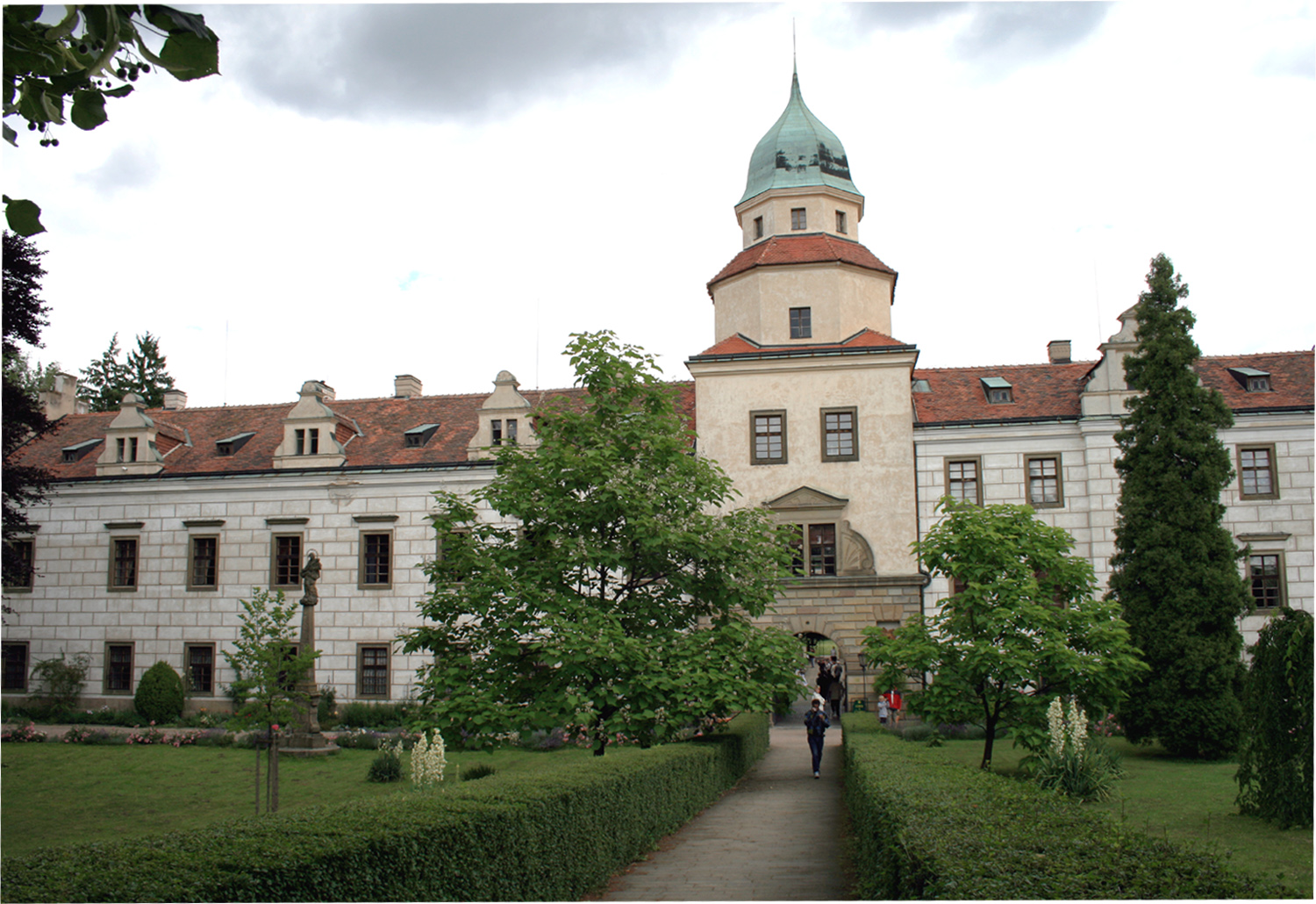
Častolovice castle, residence of the Sternberg family since 1694. After the death of Diana Phipps Sternberg, the castle ownership transferred to her daughter Alexandra von Hardegg

The lineage dates back to the 12th century, beginning with the documented ancestor Diviš of Divišov. In 1241, his descendant Zdeslav founded a fortified stronghold overlooking the Sázava River, naming it Český Šternberk (derived from the German words for "star" and "mountain"). Zdeslav became the first to officially adopt the family name, and the house established its coat of arms featuring an eight-pointed gold star on a blue field, a symbol that remains a fixture in Central European heraldry.

As the centuries progressed, the house fractured into several powerful regional branches, most notably the Konopiště, Holický, and Moravian lines. The Sternbergs consistently operated at the center of Central European politics. They served as royal high judges, burgraves, and diplomats under the Kingdom of Bohemia and the Holy Roman Empire. During the 15th-century Hussite Wars, family members were divided, with different branches aligning either with the Catholic Crown or the Hussite reformers. In 1661, the family’s immense political influence was solidified when they were elevated to the rank of Imperial Counts (Reichsgraf). By the end of the 18th and in the early 19th century, a senior branch of the family, namely Sternberg-Mandersheid, briefly achieved the status of a sovereign state with Imperial immediacy within the Holy Roman Empire after acquiring territories in Germany via marriage. Following the dissolution of the Empire in 1806, this, elder line of the family was mediatised by the Kingdom of Württemberg.

Beyond military and political rule, the House of Sternberg left a profound legacy on European science and culture. In the late 18th and early 19th centuries, members of the family became major patrons of the arts and sciences during the Czech National Revival.

The 20th century brought severe upheaval to the family. During World War II, the Sternbergs openly opposed Nazi occupation, resulting in the confiscation of their properties by the occupying regime. Though their estates were briefly returned after the war, the rise of the Communist regime in Czechoslovakia in 1948 led to the total nationalization of their castles, lands, and art collections, forcing many family members into exile. Following the Velvet Revolution of 1989, the family returned. Led by Count Zdeněk Sternberg (1923–2021), the House of Sternberg successfully restituted several of their historic ancestral properties, including Český Šternberk Castle and Častolovice castle, both of which the family continues to maintain and open to the public today.

== Notable members ==
- Leopoldine von Sternberg (1733-1809), Princess consort of Liechtenstein
- Kaspar Maria von Sternberg (1761–1838), Bohemian theologian and botanist
- Diana von Sternberg (1936-2024), interior designer and philanthropist

== See also ==
- Sternberg
