= Jacob Sternberger =

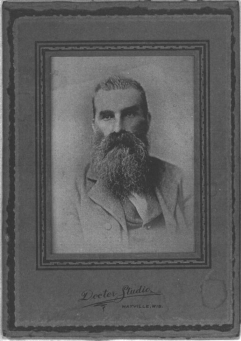
- Born: 1822
- Died: 1889 (aged 66–67)

Jacob Sternberger (German: Jakob Sternberger; 1822–1889) was a German-American Forty-Eighter. He was a grandson to Mayor of Kadaň Jakob Marzel Sternberger and an immigrant to the U.S. on whose correspondence is based one of the projects of the Max Kade Institute on German immigration in America.

Jakob Sternberger came from a prominent family in Kadaň, Bohemia. He studied at the Charles University in Prague, where he was involved in the revolutionary movement spreading across the German states. Fleeing political persecution after the Revolutions of 1848, Jakob emigrated to America in 1850, journeyed across the country, and eventually settled in Wisconsin. The Max Kade Institute has in its collection a cache of about two hundred letters of Jakob Sternberger's correspondence. The scores of letters in the Sternberger file indicate that several of Jakob's friends and family eventually joined him in his new home. For example, his brother Kajetan sent his 8-year-old son Ferdinand, who was born out of wedlock, to join Jakob on the farm.

The Sternberger Collection, which contains quite a few letters from several generations, provides a wealth of historically, socially, linguistically, and even politically relevant information. The collection contains a great deal of information on German immigrants in the United States.

== See also ==
- Sternberger
