= Diana Phipps Sternberg =

Czech noble woman (1936–2024)

- Countess
- Born: 22 February 1936; Vienna, Austria
- Died: 31 July 2024 (aged 88); Vienna, Austria
- Spouse: Henry Ogden Phipps (m. 23 April 1957; d. 11 April 1962)
Names
- Diana Franziska Alice Mary Guadeloupe Sternberg

Countess Diana Phipps Sternberg (22 February 1936 – 31 July 2024) was a Czech noble woman, interior designer, and philanthropist.

== Biography ==
Diana Franziska Alice Mary Guadeloupe von Sternberg was born on 22 February 1936 in Vienna, Austria to Count Leopold von Sternberg (1896–1957) and his wife, Countess Cecilia von Reventlow-Criminil (1908–1983).

Sternberg married Henry Ogden Phipps, an American financier, at the Holy Trinity Roman Catholic Church in Kingston, Jamaica on 23 April 1957. They had one daughter, Alexandra Hardegg. Henry died on 11 April 1962.

She published Affordable Splendour in 1981, which covers low-budget interior decoration methods through photographs, step-by-step instructions and DIY projects.

Sternberg lived in London, England until the Velvet Revolution in Czechoslovakia. Častolovice Castle and Zásmuky Château were returned to Sternberg in restitution on 31 October 1992.

Sternberg died in Vienna on 31 July 2024, at the age of 88.
