= Nat Sternberg =

American molecular biologist (1942–1995)

Nat L. Sternberg
- Born: August 2, 1942; Brooklyn, New York, U.S.
- Died: September 26, 1995 (aged 53); West Chester, Pennsylvania, U.S.
- Education: Purdue University
- Known for: P1 phage, site-specific recombination
- Scientific career
- Doctoral advisor: Sewell Champe

Nat L. Sternberg (August 2, 1942 – September 26, 1995) was an American molecular biologist and bacteriophage researcher, particularly known for his work on DNA recombination and the phage P1.

== Early life and education ==
Born in 1942 in Brooklyn, New York, Sternberg gained a BSc at Brooklyn College, followed by a master's at Long Island University. In 1969, he received a PhD from Purdue University, Indiana, researching T-even phage head proteins under the supervision of Sewell Champe.

== Career ==
In 1970–72, Sternberg held a postdoctoral fellowship at the Laboratory of Molecular Biology of the Centre national de la recherche scientifique (CNRS) in Paris, under the direction of François Gros, where he researched the head proteins of phage λ. He then returned to the US, taking up the position of staff fellow in the laboratory of Robert Weisberg at the National Institutes of Health (NIH) in Bethesda, Maryland, where he continued to study λ, in collaboration with Lynn W. Enquist and others.

Dimer of P1 Cre recombinase bound to DNA

In 1976, Sternberg joined the group being established by Michael Yarmolinsky in the Laboratory of Molecular Biology of the National Cancer Institute's Frederick Cancer Research Center at Fort Detrick, Frederick, Maryland, where he started to study the phage P1. From 1981 he directed his own group, continuing to research the P1 phage, as well as branching out to study DNA recombination in mammalian cells. In 1984, his group moved to the Central Research and Development Department of DuPont, in Wilmington, Delaware, and Sternberg was a senior research fellow at DuPont Merck at the time of his death.

Sternberg advised the NIH on human genome research. He served on the editorial board of the academic journal, Journal of Molecular Biology.

== Research ==
P1 phage had been discovered in 1951, but was little understood when Sternberg began to research the virus. He discovered the Cre–lox site-specific recombination system, in which the Cre recombinase enzyme acts at the lox recombination site to allow P1's double-stranded DNA genome to circularise after infection. Sternberg, Brian Sauer and others in his group subsequently showed that Cre–lox is a flexible recombination system which also functions in eukaryotic cells, and it is now widely used in genetic engineering. Sternberg elucidated multiple other features of the phage and its life cycle, including lytic and lysogenic replication cycles, DNA methylation and viral packaging, as well as immunity to the phage. He and his coworkers also developed P1-derived cloning vectors, enabling the cloning of very long stretches of DNA, which have been used in mapping the human genome.

== Personal life and legacy ==
Sternberg married Ilene Harfenist, also from Brooklyn, in July 1967. The couple had a daughter, Rebecca. He was diagnosed with cancer in 1987, from which he died in 1995 at West Chester, Pennsylvania. The Nat L. Sternberg Thesis Prize, an annual award for PhD theses in the field of prokaryotic molecular biology, was founded in his memory by former colleagues Lynn W. Enquist and Thomas J. Silhavy.

== Selected publications ==
Book chapters

- Michael B. Yarmolinsky, Nat Sternberg. "Bacteriophage P1". In The Bacteriophages, Vol. 1, ed. Richard Calendar, pp. 291–438 (Plenum; 1988)

Research papers

- Nat Sternberg (1990), "Bacteriophage P1 Cloning System for the Isolation, Amplification, and Recovery of DNA Fragments as Large as 100 Kilobase Pairs", Proceedings of the National Academy of Sciences of the United States of America, 87 (1): 103–7, Bibcode:1990PNAS...87..103S, doi:10.1073/pnas.87.1.103, JSTOR 2353636, PMC 53208, PMID 2404272
- Nat Sternberg; Daniel Hamilton (1981), "Bacteriophage P1 site-specific recombination. I. Recombination between loxP sites", Journal of Molecular Biology, 150 (4): 467–86, doi:10.1016/0022-2836(81)90375-2, PMID 6276557
- Nat Sternberg; David Tiemeier; Lynn Enquist (1977), "In vitro packaging of a λ Dam vector containing EcoRI DNA fragments of Escherichia coli and phage P1", Gene, 1 (3–4): 255–80, doi:10.1016/0378-1119(77)90049-X, PMID 338419
