= P1 phage =

Virus classification
- (unranked): Virus
- Realm: Duplodnaviria
- Kingdom: Heunggongvirae
- Phylum: Uroviricota
- Class: Caudoviricetes
- Genus: Punavirus
- Species: Punavirus P1

Synonyms
- Escherichia virus P1

Species of virus

P1 is a temperate bacteriophage that infects Escherichia coli and some other bacteria. When undergoing a lysogenic cycle the phage genome exists as a plasmid in the bacterium unlike other phages (e.g. the lambda phage) that integrate into the host DNA. P1 has an icosahedral head containing the DNA attached to a contractile tail with six tail fibers. The P1 phage has gained research interest because it can be used to transfer DNA from one bacterial cell to another in a process known as transduction. As it replicates during its lytic cycle it captures fragments of the host chromosome. If the resulting viral particles are used to infect a different host the captured DNA fragments can be integrated into the new host's genome. This method of in vivo genetic engineering was widely used for many years and is still used today, though to a lesser extent. P1 can also be used to create the P1-derived artificial chromosome cloning vector which can carry relatively large fragments of DNA. P1 encodes Cre recombinase, which is widely used to carry out cell-specific or time-specific DNA recombination by flanking the target DNA with loxP sites.

== Morphology ==
The virion is similar in structure to the T4 phage but simpler. It has an icosahedral head containing the genome attached at one vertex to the tail. The tail has a tube surrounded by a contractile sheath. It ends in a base plate with six tail fibres. The tail fibres are involved in attaching to the host and providing specificity.

== Genome ==
The genome of the P1 phage is moderately large, around 93kbp in length (compared to the genomes of e.g. T4 – 169kbp, lambda – 48kbp and Ff – 6.4kbp). In the viral particle it is in the form of a linear double stranded DNA molecule. Once inserted into the host it circularizes and replicates as a plasmid.

In the viral particle the DNA molecule is longer (110kbp) than the actual length of the genome. It is created by cutting an appropriately sized fragment from a concatemeric DNA chain having multiple copies of the genome (see the section below on lysis for how this is made). Due to this the ends of the DNA molecule are identical. This is referred to as being terminally redundant. This is important for the DNA to be circularized in the host. Another consequence of the DNA being cut out of a concatemer is that a given linear molecule can start at any location on the circular genome. This is called a cyclic permutation.

The genome is especially rich in Chi sequences recognized by the bacterial recombinase RecBCD. The genome contains two origins of replication: oriR which replicates it during the lysogenic cycle and oriL which replicates it during the lytic stage. The genome of P1 encodes three tRNAs which are expressed in the lytic stage.

The genome of P1 encodes 112 proteins and 5 untranslated genes and is this about twice the size of bacteriophage lambda.

== Life cycle ==
=== Infection and early stages ===
The phage particle adsorbs onto the surface of the bacterium using the tail fibers for specificity. The tail sheath contracts and the DNA of the phage is injected into the host cell. The host DNA recombination machinery or the cre enzyme translated from the viral DNA recombine the terminally redundant ends and circularize the genome. Depending on various physiological cues, the phage may immediately proceed to the lytic phase or it may enter a lysogenic state.

The gene that encodes the tail fibers have a set of sequences that can be targeted by a site specific recombinase Cin. This causes the C terminal end of the protein to switch between two alternate forms at a low frequency. The viral tail fibers are responsible for the specificity of binding to the host receptor. The targets of the viral tail fibers are under a constant pressure to evolve and evade binding. This method of recombinational diversity of the tail allows the virus to keep up with the bacterium. This system has close sequence homologies to recombinational systems in the tail fibers of unrelated phages like the mu phage and the lambda phage.

=== Lysogeny ===
The genome of the P1 phage is maintained as a low copy number plasmid in the bacterium. The relatively large size of the plasmid requires it to keep a low copy number lest it become too large a metabolic burden while it is a lysogen. As there is usually only one copy of the plasmid per bacterial genome, the plasmid stands a high chance of not being passed to both daughter cells. The P1 plasmid combats this by several methods:

- The plasmid replication is tightly regulated by a RepA protein dependent mechanism. This is similar to the mechanism used by several other plasmids. It ensure that the plasmid divides in step with the host genome.
- Interlocked plasmids are quickly unlinked by Cre-lox recombination
- The plasmid encodes a plasmid addiction system that kills daughter cells that lose the plasmid. It consists of a stable protein toxin and an antitoxin that reversibly binds to and neutralizes it. Cells that lose the plasmid get killed as the antitoxin gets degraded faster than the toxin.

=== Lysis ===
The P1 plasmid has a separate origin of replication (oriL) that is activated during the lytic cycle. Replication begins by a regular bidirectional theta replication at oriL but later in the lytic phase, it switches to a rolling circle method of replication using the host recombination machinery. This results in numerous copies of the genome being present on a single linear DNA molecule called a concatemer. The end of the concatemer is cut a specific site called the pac site or packaging site. This is followed by the packing of the DNA into the heads till they are full. The rest of the concatemer that does not fit into one head is separated and the machinery begins packing this into a new head. The location of the cut is not sequence specific. Each head holds around 110kbp of DNA so there is a little more than one complete copy of the genome (~90kbp) in each head, with the ends of the strand in each head being identical. After infecting a new cell this terminal redundancy is used by the host recombination machinery to cyclize the genome if it lacks two copies of the lox locus. If two lox sites are present (one in each terminally redundant end) the cyclization is carried out by the Cre recombinase.

Once the complete virions are assembled, the host cell is lysed, releasing the viral particles.

== History ==
P1 was discovered in 1951 by Giuseppe Bertani in Salvador Luria's laboratory, but the phage was little studied until Ed Lennox, also in Luria's group, showed in 1954–5 that it could transduce genetic material between host bacteria. This discovery led to the phage being used for genetic exchange and genome mapping in E. coli, and stimulated its further study as a model organism. In the 1960s, Hideo Ikeda and Jun-ichi Tomizawa showed the phage's DNA genome to be linear and double-stranded, with redundancy at the ends. In the 1970s, Nat Sternberg characterised the Cre–lox site-specific recombination system, which allows the linear genome to circularise to form a plasmid after infection. During the 1980s, Sternberg developed P1 as a vector for cloning large pieces of eukaryotic DNA. A P1 gene map based on a partial DNA sequence was published in 1993 by Michael Yarmolinsky and Małgorzata Łobocka, and the genome was completely sequenced by Łobocka and colleagues in 2004.
