= Kaspar Maria von Sternberg =

Czech botanist, geologist, paleontologist and nobleman (1761–1838)

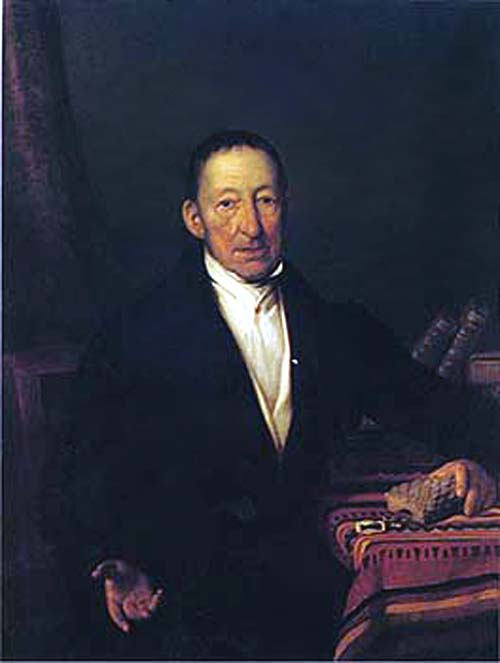
- 1838 painting of Sternberg by Alexander Clarot
- Born: Kaspar Maria von Sternberg; 6 January 1761; Prague
- Died: December 20, 1838 (aged 77); Březina Castle
- Occupations: Theologian, mineralogist, geognosist, entomologist, botanist
- Known for: Established Bohemian National Museum in Prague, considered founder of modern paleobotany
- Scientific career
- Author abbrev. (botany): Sternb.

Count Kaspar Maria von Sternberg (also: Caspar Maria, Count Sternberg, German: Kaspar Maria Graf von Sternberg, Czech: Kašpar Maria hrabě ze Šternberka; 6 January 1761 – 20 December 1838) was a Bohemian aristocrat, theologian, mineralogist, geognost, entomologist and botanist. He is known as the "Father of Paleobotany".

== Early life and ancestry ==
Born into one of the most prominent Bohemian noble families, he was the youngest child of Count Johann Nepomuk I von Sternberg (1713-1798) and his wife, Countess Maria Anna Josefa Kolowrat-Krakowsky (1726-1790). He had two elder sisters: Countess Josefa Anna (1748-1787), Countess Maria Leopoldina (1749-1749), and two brothers: Count Johann Nepomuk II (1752-1789), a Colonel killed at Mühlbach, Transylvania and Count Joachim (1755-1808).

== Biography ==
He established the Bohemian National Museum in Prague, where his collection of minerals, fossils and plant specimens formed the core collection, and he is deemed to be the founder of modern paleobotany. As of 1820, he was on friendly terms with Johann Wolfgang von Goethe.

Originally a student of theology, he attended the Collegium anglicum in Rome, from where he obtained a lower ordination. In his youth, he aspired to be a soldier, but soon, under the pressure of his parents and brothers, he decided to pursue an ecclesiastical career. At the age of 11, Pope Clement XIV obtained for him the position of canon in Freising and later also in Regensburg.

Inspired by the newly founded Regensburg Botanical Society (1790), he became an avid naturalist, subsequently becoming a prominent member of the society, making contributions to its Botanisches Taschenbuch and also establishing a botanical garden in Regensburg. In 1805, during an extended stay in Paris, he met with Alexander von Humboldt and came under the influence of a number of French paleontologists and botanists. Afterwards, he relocated to an estate in Radnice, Bohemia. Here, he created a botanical garden, and conducted important paleobotanical research at recently opened coal mines located in the surrounding areas.

The botanical genus Sternbergia is named in his honor.

== Publications ==
- Abhandlung über die Pflanzenkunde in Böhmen (two volumes 1817–1818) - Treatise on the botany of Bohemia.
- Briefwechsel (1820-1832) - Correspondence with Johann Wolfgang von Goethe.
- Versuch einer geognostisch-botanischen Darstellung der Flora der Vorwelt (with August Karl Joseph Corda, 1820–1825; two volumes) - Attempt at a geognostic-botanical description of primordial flora.
- Ausgewählte Werke des Grafen Kaspar von Sternberg, 1902 - Selected works of Count Kaspar von Sternberg.
- Leben des Grafen Kaspar von Sternberg, 2010 - The life of Count Kaspar von Sternberg.

The standard botanical author abbreviation Sternb. is applied to species he described.
