= P1-derived artificial chromosome =

DNA vector used in bioengineering

A P1-derived artificial chromosome, or PAC, is a DNA construct derived from the DNA of P1 bacteriophages. It can carry large amounts (about 100–300 kilobases) of other sequences for a variety of bioengineering purposes in bacteria. It is one type of the efficient cloning vector used to clone DNA fragments (100- to 300-kb insert size; average,150 kb) in Escherichia coli cells.

== History of PAC ==
The bacteriophage P1 was first isolated by Giuseppe Bertani. In his study, he noticed that the lysogen produced abnormal non-continuous phages, and later found phage P1 was produced from the Lisbonne lysogen strain, in addition to bacteriophages P2 and P3. P1 has the ability to copy a bacteria's host genome and integrate that DNA information into other bacteria hosts, also known as generalized transduction. In the 1990s, P1 was developed as a cloning vector by Nat Sternberg and colleagues. It is capable of Cre-Lox recombination. The P1 vector system was first developed to carry relatively large DNA fragments in plasmids (95-100kb).

== Construction ==
PAC has 2 loxP sites, which can be used by phage recombinases to form the product from its cre-gene recognition during Cre-Lox recombination. This process circularizes the DNA strand, forming a plasmid, which can then be inserted into bacteria such as Escherichia coli. The transformation is usually done by electroporation, which uses a strong electric field to allow the plasmids to permeate into the cells. If high expression levels are desired, the P1 lytic replicon can be used in constructs. Electroporation allows for lysogeny of PACs so that they can replicate within cells without disturbing other replicons.

== Comparison with Other Artificial Chromosomes ==
PAC is one of the artificial chromosome vectors. Some other artificial chromosomes include: bacterial artificial chromosome, yeast artificial chromosome (YAC), and the human artificial chromosome. Compared to other artificial chromosomes, it can carry relatively large DNA fragments, however less so than the YACs. Some advantages of PACs compared to YACs includes easier manipulation of bacteria system, easier separation from DNA hosts, higher transformation rate, more stable inserts, and they are non-chimeric which means they do not rearrange and ligate to form new DNA strand, allowing for a user friendly vector choice.

== Applications ==
PAC is commonly used as a large capacity vector which allows propagation of large DNA inserts in Escherichia coli. This feature has been commonly used for:

- building genome libraries for human, mouse, etc, helps with projects such as Human Genome Project
- libraries served as the template for gene sequencing (example: used as gene template in mouse gene function analysis)
- genome analysis on specific functions of different genes for more complex organisms (plants, animals, etc.)
- facilitate gene expression

Since PAC was derived from phages, PAC and its variants are also useful in the PAC-based phage therapy and antibiotic studies.

== See also ==
- Bacterial artificial chromosome
- Human artificial chromosome
- Yeast artificial chromosome
