= Březina (Rokycany District) =

- Municipality
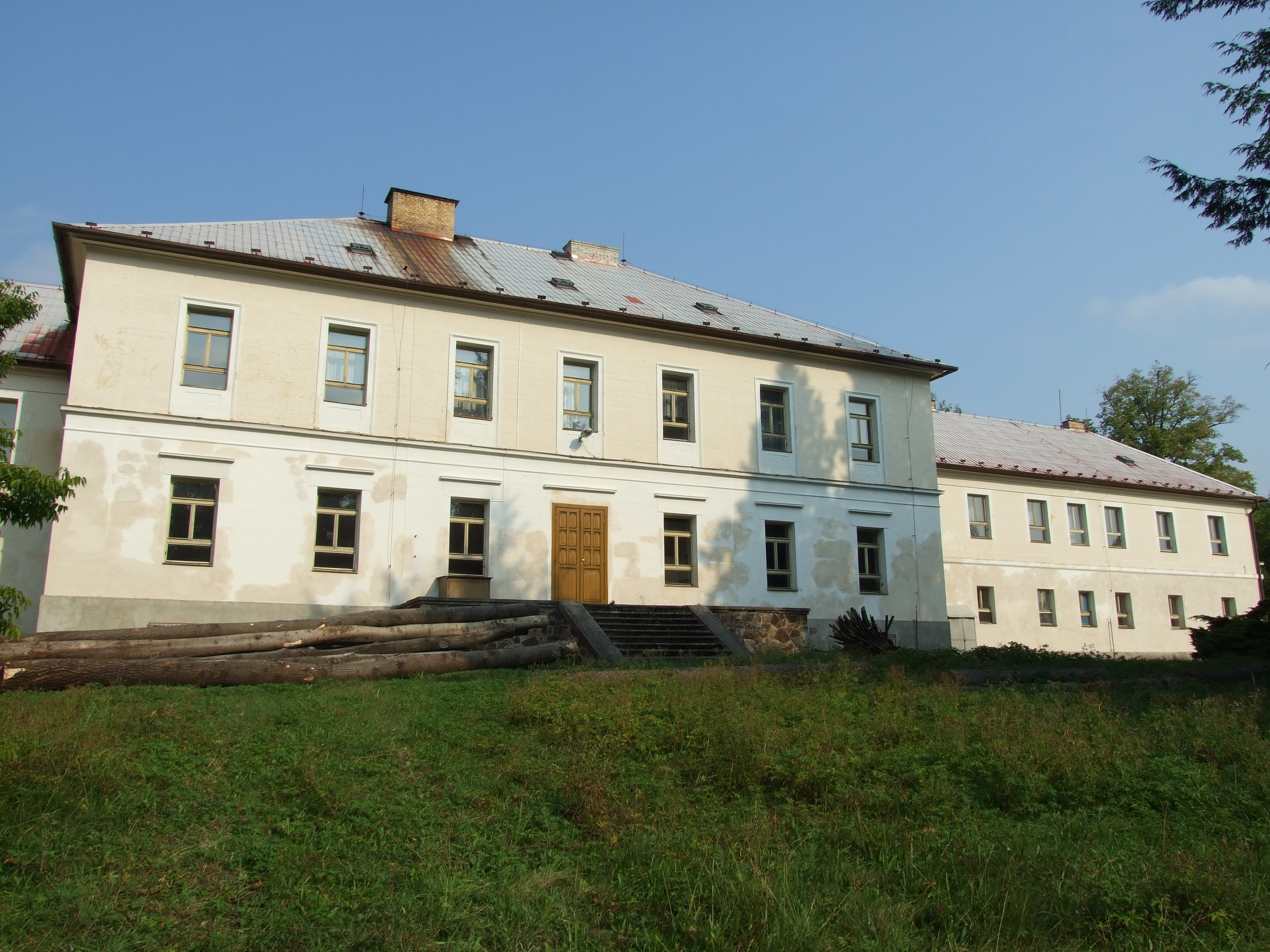
- Březina Castle

- Flag Coat of arms

- Location in the Czech Republic
- Coordinates: 49°48′27″N 13°35′49″E
- Country: Czech Republic
- Region: Plzeň
- District: Rokycany
- First mentioned: 1379

Area
  - Total: 7.60 km^{2} (2.93 sq mi)
- Elevation: 483 m (1,585 ft)

Population (2026-01-01)
  - Total: 399
  - Density: 52.5/km^{2} (136/sq mi)
- Time zone: UTC+1 (CET)
  - Summer (DST): UTC+2 (CEST)
- Postal code: 338 24
- Website: www.obecbrezina.eu

Březina (German: Brzezina) is a municipality and village in Rokycany District in the Plzeň Region of the Czech Republic. It has about 400 inhabitants.

== Etymology ==
The name means 'birch forest' in Czech. The village was founded on the site of a cleared birch forest.

== Geography ==
Březina is located about 7 kilometres (4 mi) north of Rokycany and 15 km (9 mi) northeast of Plzeň. It lies in the Křivoklát Highlands. The highest point is the Hradiště hill at 619 m (2,031 ft) above sea level. The stream Korečný potok originates in Březina and flows across the municipal territory.

== History ==
There was an ancient Slavic gord on the hill Hradiště. It was one of the oldest gords in the region.

The first written mention of Březina is from 1379. From 1379 to 1651, Březina was the centre of an estate, administered from the Březina Castle. It was owned by various noble families and ofter changed hands. During the Thirty Years' War, the castle was devastated, and in 1661, it was described as abandoned.

From 1682 to 1758, Březina was property of the Bubna of Litice family. In 1758, it was acquired by the Sternberg family, who were its most notable owners. In the early 19th century, they had built here a new castle. Kaspar Maria von Sternberg established a large castle park with rare species, although many of them were destroyed by frost in 1929.

== Demographics ==
Historical population

Year	Pop.	±%
1869	636	—
1880	664	+4.4%
1890	725	+9.2%
1900	725	+0.0%
1910	668	−7.9%

Year	Pop.	±%
1921	666	−0.3%
1930	596	−10.5%
1950	545	−8.6%
1961	457	−16.1%
1970	425	−7.0%

Year	Pop.	±%
1980	354	−16.7%
1991	294	−16.9%
2001	298	+1.4%
2011	327	+9.7%
2021	372	+13.8%

Source: Censuses

== Transport ==
There are no railways or major roads passing through the municipality.

== Sights ==
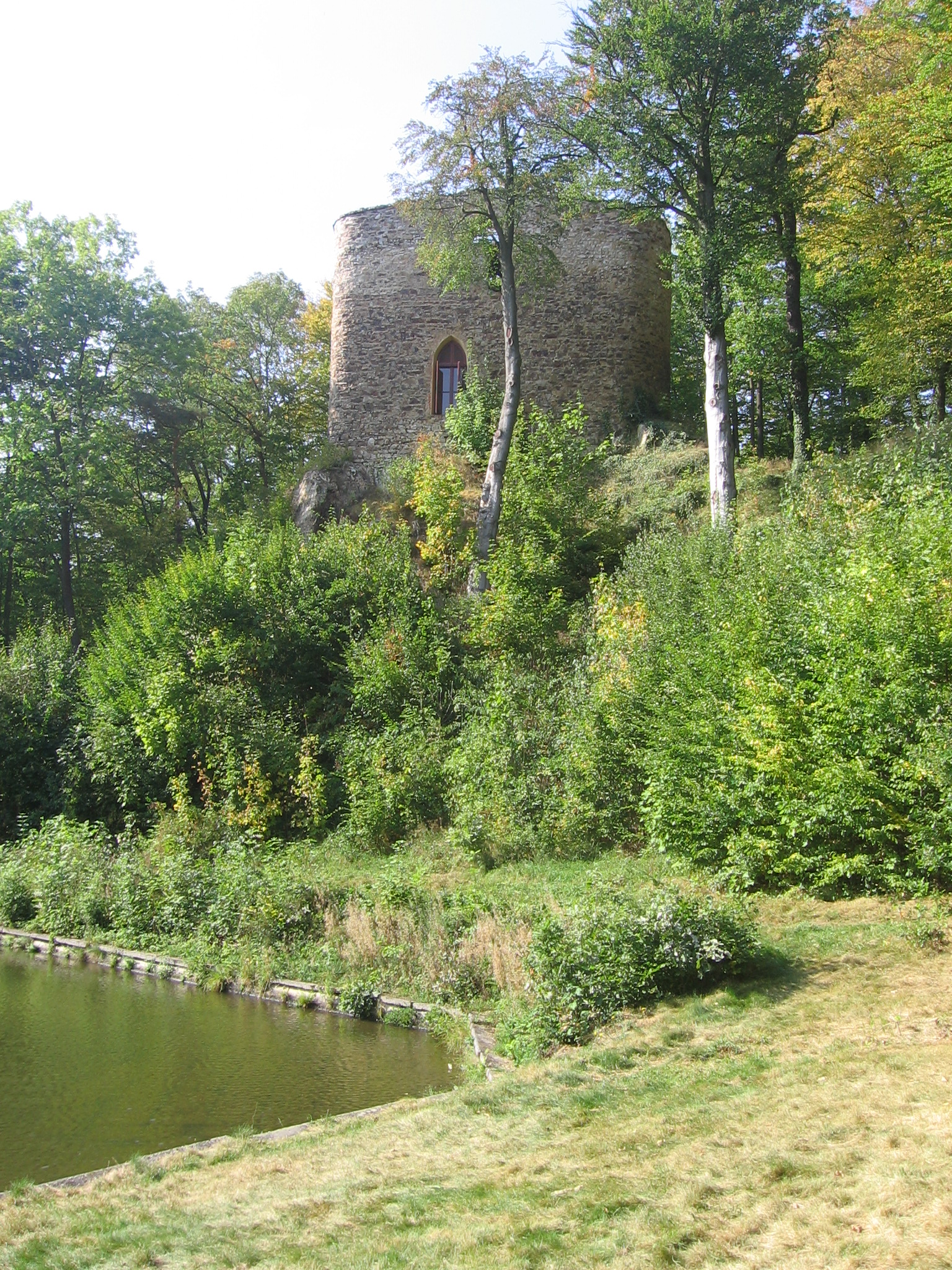
Salon Castle

Neo-Gothic reconstructions of the ruin of the original Březina Castle were made in the 19th century, and the castle became known as Salon. It is a landmark of Březina located on a hill above the village.

The new Březina Castle was built in the Empire style in 1790–1808. The Sternbergs owned it until 1949, when it was confiscated by the state. Until 2002, the castle housed a forestry training school. In 1990, the castle was returned to the Sternbergs.

== Notable people ==
- Kaspar Maria von Sternberg (1761–1838), nobleman and scientist; died here
- Vlasta Burian (1891–1962), actor; used to spend vacations on his cottage in Březina
