= Český Šternberk Castle =

13th c. Bohemian castle

- Hrad Český Šternberk
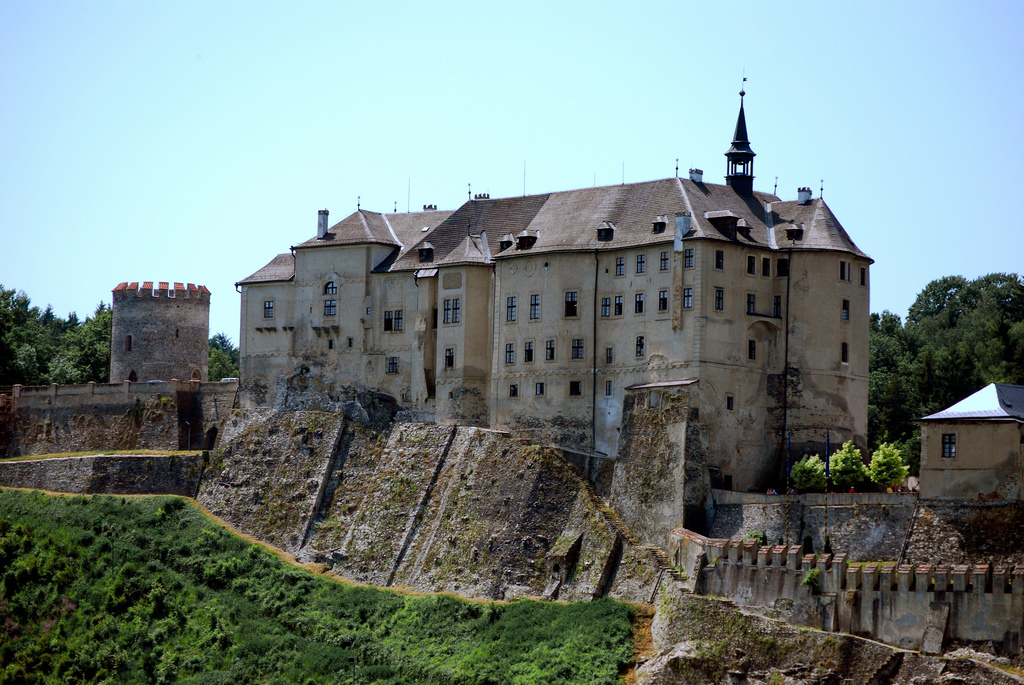
- The eastern view of the castle Český Šternberk

- Location within Czech Republic

General information
- Type: Medieval castle
- Architectural style: Gothic architecture, Baroque, Rococo
- Location: Český Šternberk, Central Bohemian Region, Czech Republic, Czech Republic
- Coordinates: 49°48′54″N 14°55′36″E
- Elevation: 378 m (1,240 ft)
- Owner: House of Sternberg

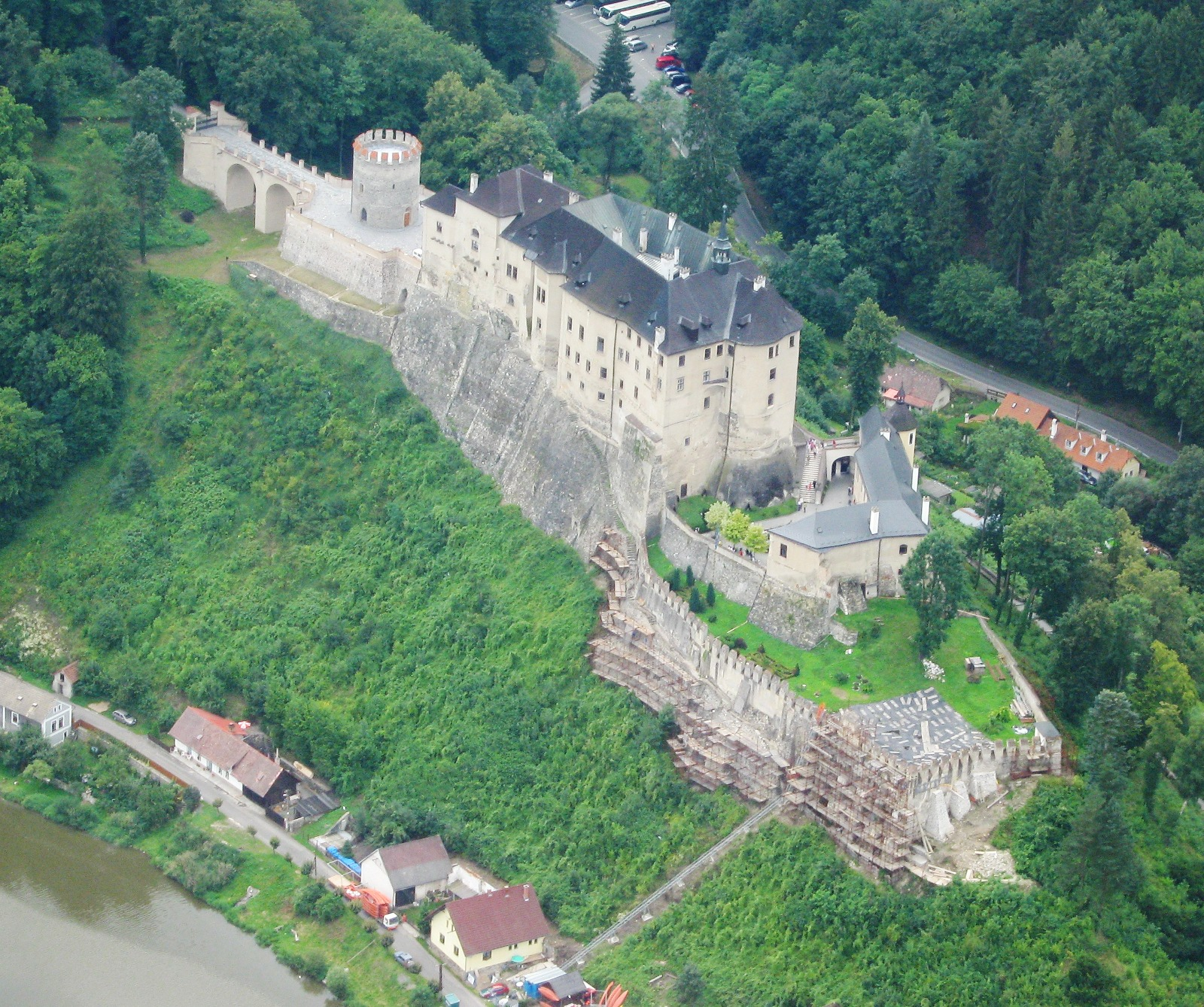
Aerial view of Český Šternberk Castle

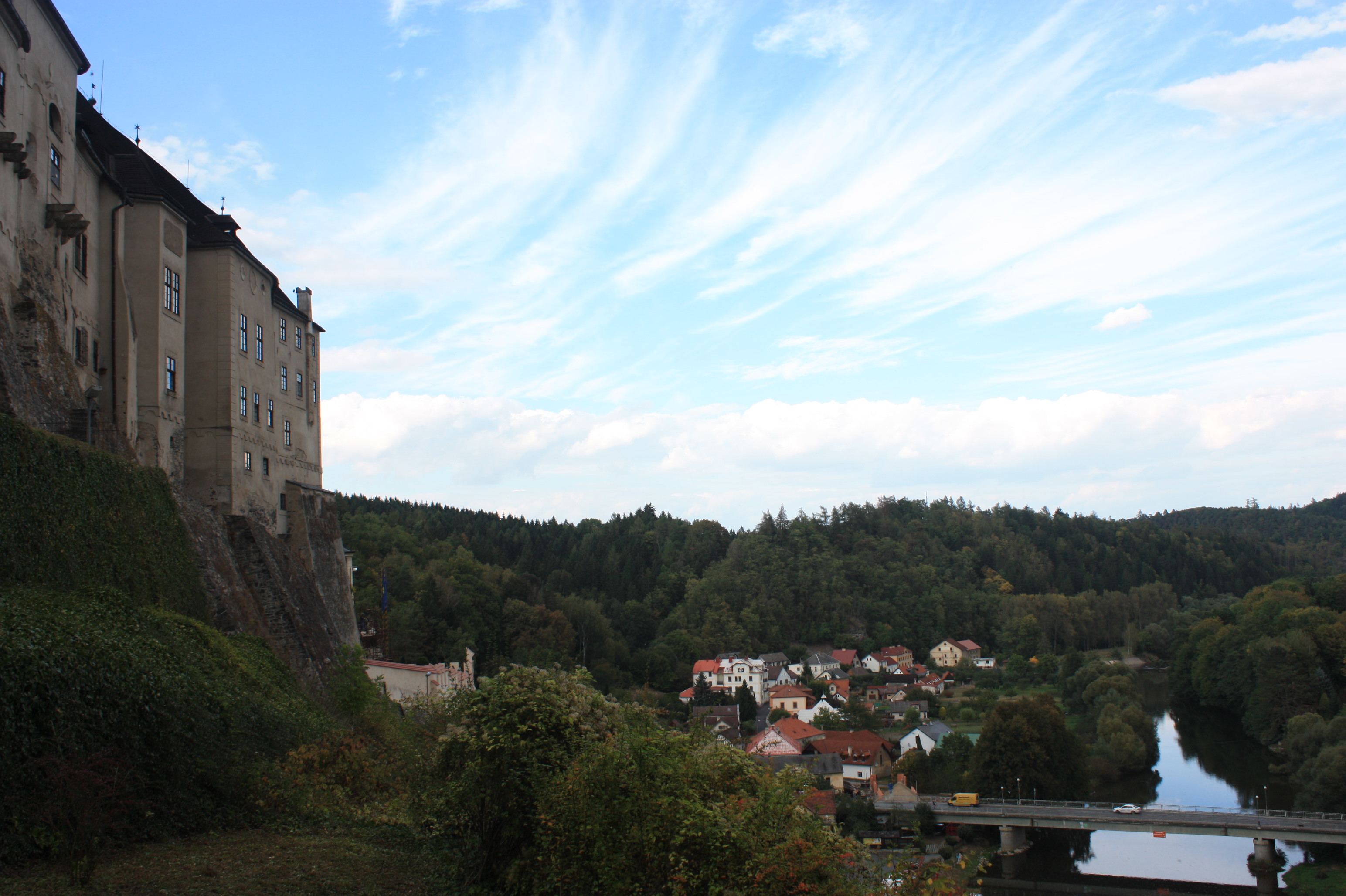
Český Šternberk Castle and Sázava river

Český Šternberk Castle (Czech: Hrad Český Šternberk) is a castle of the mid-13th century, located on the west side of the river Sázava overlooking the eponymous market town in the Central Bohemian Region of the Czech Republic. It is an early Gothic castle which was constructed, named and still owned by members of the same family. Český Šternberk Castle is today a residence that bears a long historical and architectural heritage and represents an attractive tourist destination open to the public. It is considered one of the best preserved Gothic Bohemian castles.

== Name ==
The name Šternberk derives from the German language and is the Czech spelling of the German composite word Sternberg (literally meaning "Starmountain": Stern meaning "star" and Berg meaning "mountain"). It originates from the founder of the castle, Zdeslav z Divišova's coat of arms, bearing an eight-pointed golden star. Eventually he changed his surname to Sternberg and the heraldic symbol was accompanied by the motto: "The star that never falls down".

== History ==
The castle was initially built in 1241 by Bohemian nobleman Zdeslav z Divišova, later called Zdeslav of Sternberg (d. 1265). The development of new firearms in the 14th century posed an unexpected threat to the defensibility of the castle. Its 13th century architects hadn't foreseen the danger of long-range firearms and its reinforcement became a necessity. During this period the Český Šternberk castle's fortifications were improved through the construction in the north of a three-story tower, which was connected to the castle by a rampart.

In 1467 the castle was seized by the royal armies of George of Poděbrady. Later, the ruined castle was regained by Šternberk's aristocracy, who, by the turn of the 15th to 16th century, had reconstructed the castle, renewed its defensive system and expanded it with the construction of a new cylindrical tower in the south and the Dungeon in the north. The castle managed to survive the looting of the rebels in 1627, during the Thirty Years' War.

With the death of Imperial Count Jan Václav on 1712, who served as High Burgrave of Moravia, the Holický branch of the House of Sternberg died out and its ownership passed to other families, who in 1751 built the lower palace next to the surrounding wall.

The ownership of the castle was returned to the Sternberg family in 1841 when Zdeněk of Sternberg from the Konopiště branch of the family bought it. It remained in Sternberg's ownership until 1949 when it was "nationalized" by the Communist government of the Republic of Czechoslovakia. The family moved to a small flat in Prague and Jiří Sternberg, agreed to work as a steward in his own property and gave tours within the castle, which became a sightseeing spot. After the fall of Communism and the Velvet Revolution, in 1992, thanks to the restitution's law, Český Šternberk Castle returned to Jiří's son, the count Zdeněk Sternberg. After his death in 2021, the castle is administered by Zdeněk's son, Filip Sternberg (b. 29 October 1956).

== Architecture ==
Český Šternberk Castle was originally built as a Gothic castle. Eventually it underwent several periods of reconstructions and further fortification and the Gothic architectural features were in parts concealed by the new reconstructions. Especially the interiors of the castle were realized under the Baroque and Rococo styles. In 1760, the master Carlo Brentano performed the elaborate stuccoing and renderings of the halls' interiors. The castle offers a rare collection of 545 copper engravings, depicting the entire history of the Thirty Years' War. Also, historical weapons and hunting trophies are exhibited within the castle's halls.

== Location ==
The castle is located within Benešov District in the Central Bohemian Region of the Czech Republic. It stands on top of a steep granite cliff on the western banks of the Sázava river in the market town of Český Šternberk, 39 kilometres (24 mi) southeast of the capital Prague, along D1 motorway.

== In popular culture ==
Český Šternberk Castle appears in several scenes throughout the Albanian-Czech romantic drama film The Sorrow of Mrs. Schneider (Czech: Smutek paní Snajdrové). The events of the film take place in 1961, in Český Šternberk and the role of the count Jiří Sternberg, the father of today's owner of the castle Zdeněk Sternberg, is portrayed by the internationally acclaimed Italian actor Michele Placido.

Count Zdeněk Sternberg, happy to meet the Italian actor and after learning that he was interpreting his father in the movie, generously offered free use of the castle's spaces. Anyway, he couldn't meet with Michele Placido after falling ill during the filming days. There is a whole considerable scene within Český Šternberk Castle, a remarkable dialogue between the movie's main character and count Sternberg (Placido).

== Gallery ==
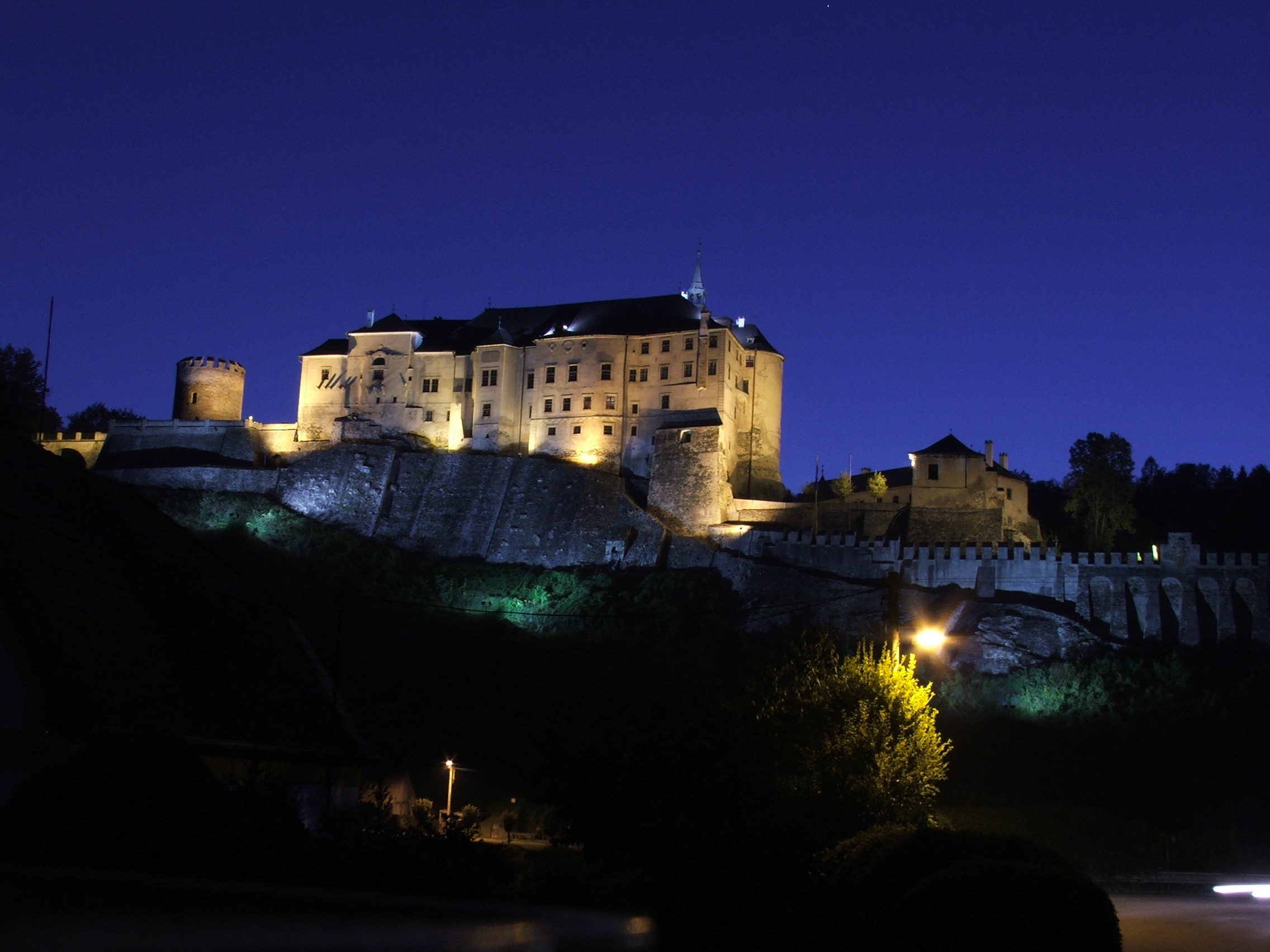
Český Šternberk Castle at dusk

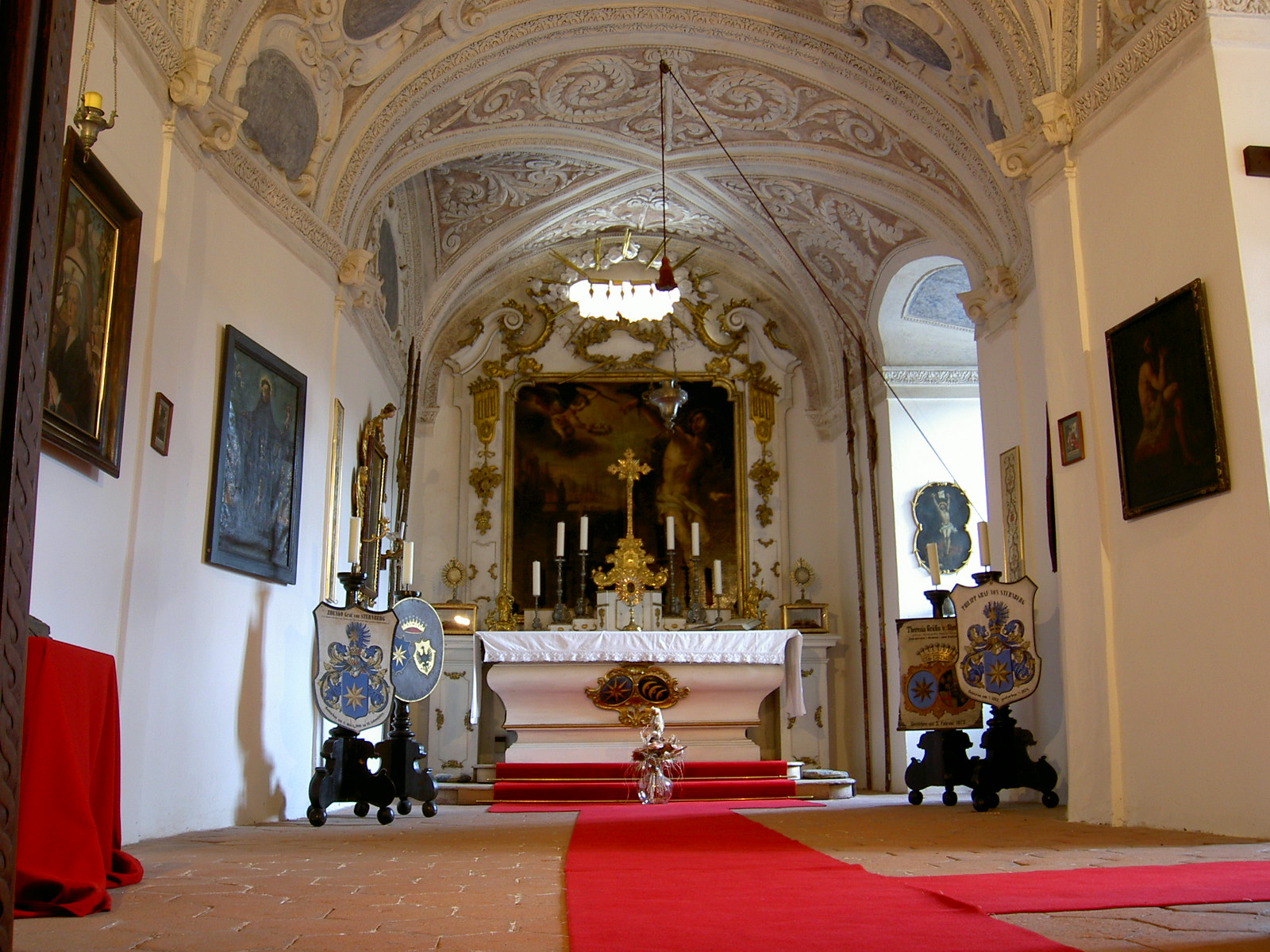
St. Sebastian chapel within the castle

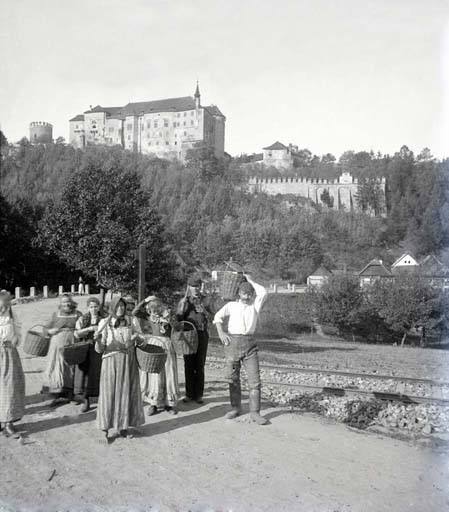
The castle in 1892

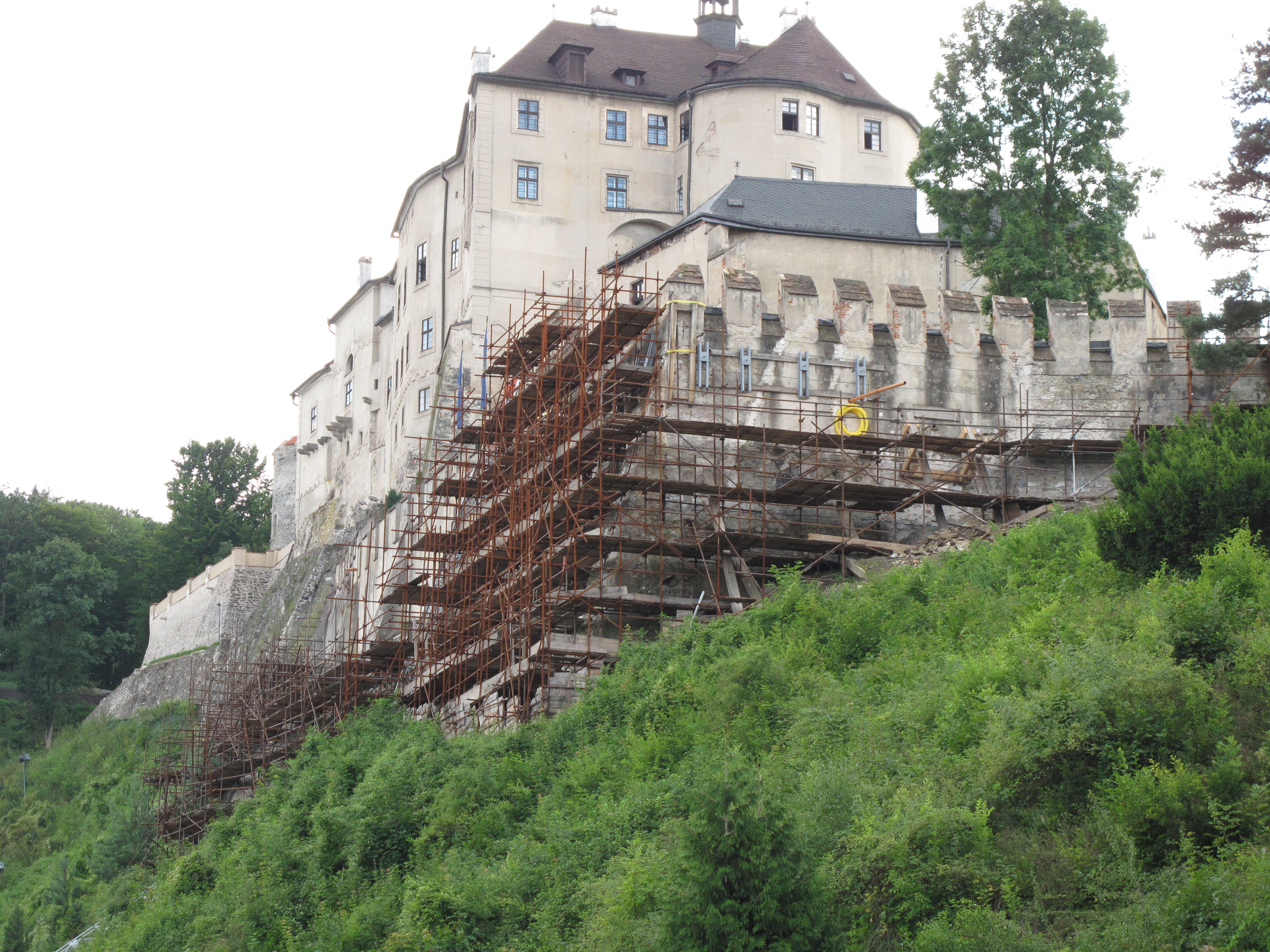
Minor reconstruction north of Český Šternberk castle in August 2010

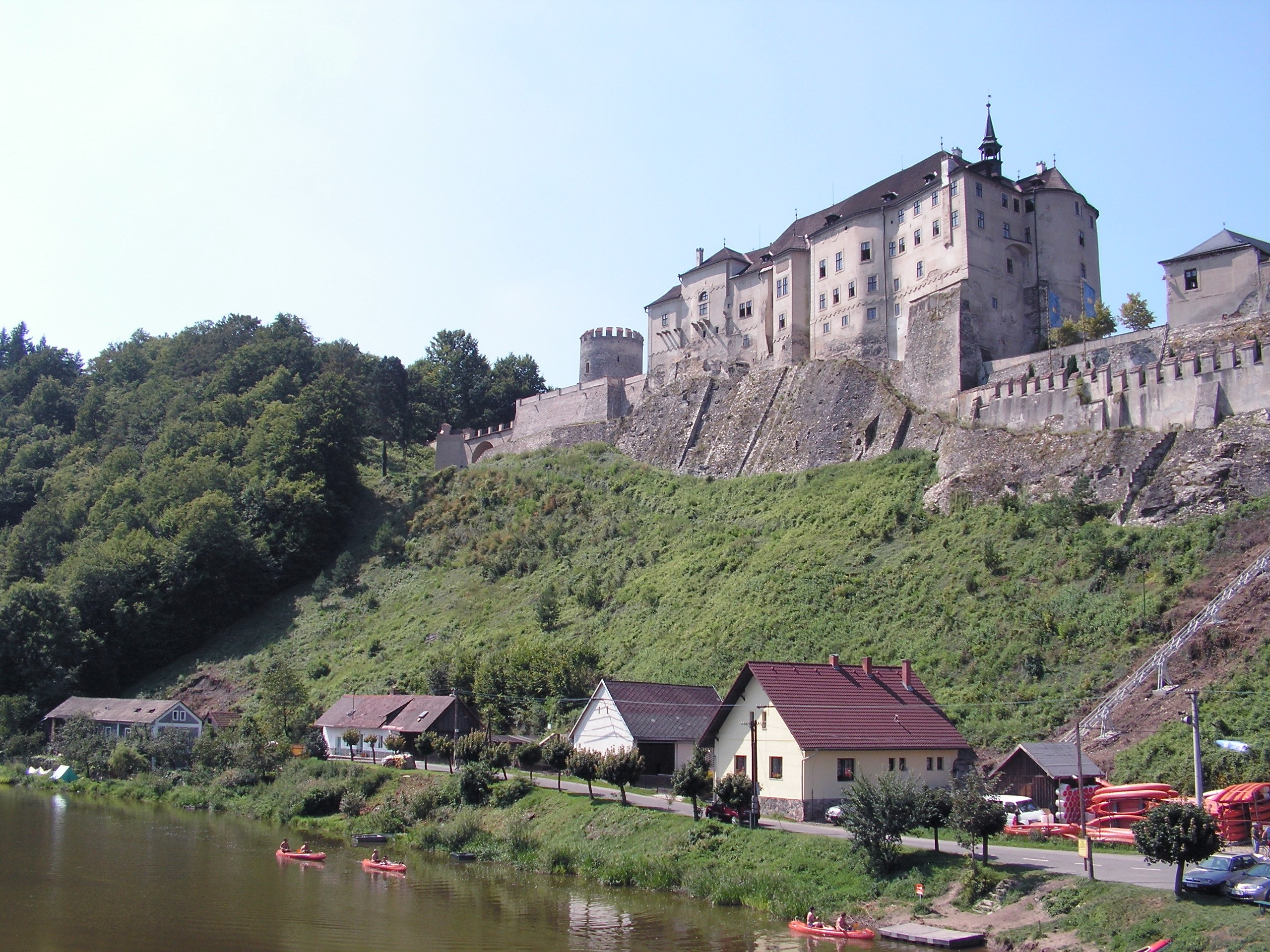
View from the bridge over the Sázava to the castle

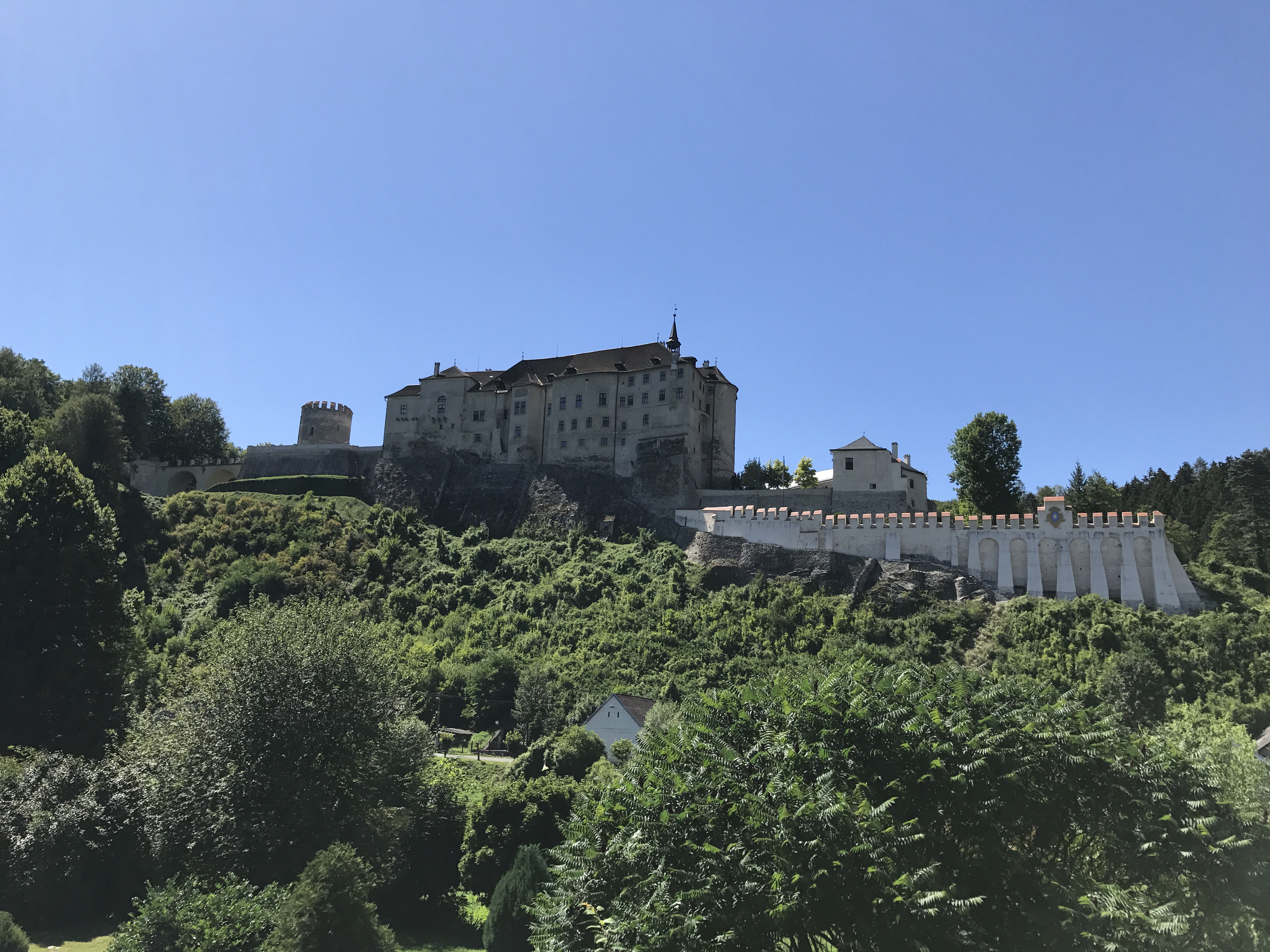
Český Šternberk Castle

== See also ==
- List of castles in the Czech Republic
- Tourism in the Czech Republic
- History of the Czech lands in the Middle Ages
