= Maya Sternberg =

American public health statistician

Maya Raquel Sternberg is an American public health statistician, a statistician at the National Center of Environmental Health in the US Centers for Disease Control and Prevention, and a part-time instructor in the Department of Population Health Sciences at the Georgia State University School of Public Health.

== Family and early life ==
Sternberg is the only daughter of Thomas (Shlomo) Paul Sternberg (1937–2023), a Jewish refugee from Arad, Romania to Israel in 1950 and then, in 1952, to the US; he became a statistician and travel software entrepreneur. Sternberg's mother, née Jette Ibk Jakobsen, was an immigrant from Denmark who became unable to walk from multiple sclerosis. Sternberg credits her interests in statistics and public health to a childhood fascination with chaos theory, her father's work in statistics, and her mother's health issues.

== Education and career ==
Sternberg was a double major in mathematics and industrial management at Carnegie Mellon University, graduating with double bachelor's degrees in 1989. She received a master's degree in biostatistics at Emory University in 1996, and completed her Ph.D. at Emory in 1997. Her doctoral dissertation, Discrete-time nonparametric estimation for chain-of-events data subject to interval censoring and truncation, was jointly advised by Glen Satten and Ira Longini.

She joined the Centers for Disease Control and Prevention soon after receiving her doctorate.

== Recognition ==
Sternberg was elected as a Fellow of the American Statistical Association in 2018. She was the 2023 recipient of the Pat Doyle Award of the American Statistical Association Government Statistics Section, "for her distinguished contributions to the American Statistical Association and her invaluable service to the profession through her impactful collaborations at the Centers for Disease Control and Prevention".
