= Sternberger =

Origin
- Language: German
- Region of origin: Germany, Bohemia

Other names
- Variant form: Sternberg (surname)

Sternberger is a surname. Notable people with the surname include:

- Dolf Sternberger (1907–1989), German philosopher
- Estelle Sternberger (1886–1971), American activist, writer and broadcaster
- Jace Sternberger (born 1997), American football player
- Jakob Marzel Sternberger (1750–1822), Bohemian German mayor

- Jacob Sternberger, grandson of Jakob Marzel Sternberger

- Lionel Sternberger, credited by some with producing the first cheeseburger
- Marcel Sternberger (1899–1956), Hungarian-American portrait photographer

== See also ==
- Sternberger Seenlandschaft, Amt in the district of Parchim, Mecklenburg-Vorpommern
- Großer Sternberger See, lake in Mecklenburg-Vorpommern, Germany
