= Insert (molecular biology) =

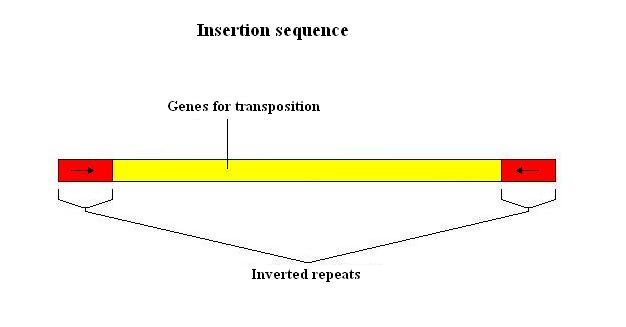
Inserted sequence

In molecular biology, an insert is a piece of DNA that is inserted into a larger DNA vector by a recombinant DNA technique, such as ligation or recombination. This allows it to be multiplied, selected, further manipulated or expressed in a host organism.

Inserts can range from physical nucleotide additions using a technique system or the addition of artificial structures on a molecule via mutagenic chemicals, such as ethidium bromide or crystals.

Inserts into the genome of an organism normally occur due to natural causes. These causes include environmental conditions and intracellular processes. Environmental inserts range from exposure to radioactive radiation such as Ultraviolet, mutagenic chemicals, or DNA viruses. Intracellular inserts can occur through heritable changes in parent cells or errors in DNA replication or DNA repair.

Gene insertion techniques can be used for characteristic mutations in an organism for a desired phenotypic gene expression. A gene insert change can be expressed in a large variety of ends. These variants can range from the loss, or gain, of protein function to changes in physical structure i.e., hair, or eye, color. The goal of changes in expression are focused on a gain of function in proteins for regulation or to termination of cellular function for prevention of disease. The results of the variations are dependent on the place in the genome the addition, or mutation is located. The aim is to learn, understand, and possibly predict the expression of genetic material in organisms using physical and chemical analysis. To see the results of genetic mutations, or inserts, techniques such as DNA sequencing, gel electrophoresis, immunoassay, or microscopy can observe mutation.

== History ==
The field has expanded significantly since the publication in 1973 with biochemists Stanley N. Cohen and Herbert W. Boyer by using E. coli bacteria to learn how to cut fragments, rejoin different fragments, and insert the new genes. The field has expanded tremendously in terms of precision and accuracy since then. Computers and technology have made it technologically easier to achieve narrowing of error and expand understanding in this field. Computers having a high capacity for data and calculations which made processing the large volume of information tangible, i.e., the use of ChIP and gene sequence.

== Techniques and protocols ==
Homology directed repair (HDR) is a technique repairs breaks or lesions in DNA molecules. The most common technique to add inserts to desired sequences is the use of homologous recombination. This technique has a specific requirement where the insert can only be added after it has been introduced to the nucleus of the cell, which can be added to the genome mostly during the G2 and S phases in the cell cycle.

== CRISPR gene editing ==
CRISPR gene editing based on Clustered regularly interspaced short palindromic repeats (CRISPR) -Cas9 is an enzyme that uses the gene sequences to help control, cleave, and separate specific DNA sequences that are complementary to a CRISPR sequence. These sequences and enzymes were originally derived from bacteriophages. The importance of this technique in the field of genetic engineering is that it gives the ability to have highly precise targeted gene editing and the cost factor for this technique is low compared to other tools. The ability to insert DNA sequences into the organism is easy and fast, although it can run into expression issues in higher complex organisms.

== Transcription activator-like effector nuclease ==
Transcription activator-like effector nuclease, TALENs, are a set of restriction enzymes that be created to cut out desired DNA sequences. These enzymes are mostly used in combination with CRISPR-CAS9, Zinc finger nuclease, or HDR. The main reason for this is the ability for these enzymes to have the precision to cut and separate the desired sequence within a gene.

== Zinc finger nuclease ==
Zinc finger nucleases are genetically engineered enzymes that combine fusing a zinc finger DNA-binding domain on a DNA-cleavage domain. These are also combined with CRISPR-CAS9 or TALENs to gain a sequence-specific addition, or deletion, within the genome of more complex cells and organisms.

== Gene gun ==
The gene gun, also known as a biolistic particle delivery system, is used to deliver transgenes, proteins, or RNA into the cell. It uses a micro-projectile delivery system that shoots coated particles of a typical heavy metal that has DNA of interest into cells using high speed. The genetic material will penetrate the cell and deliver the contents over a space area. The use of micro-projectile delivery systems is a technique known as biolistic.
