= Theodor Sternberg =

Theodor Hermann Sternberg (5 January 1878 – 18 April 1950) was a German legal philosopher serving as a foreign advisor in Meiji period Japan, where he was an important contributor to the development of civil law in Japan.

== Biography ==
Born in Berlin, Sternberg served as an instructor at Tokyo Imperial University from 1913 to 1918. He also lectured on occasion at Meiji University, and other major Japanese universities, speaking on civil law, criminal law and jurisprudence.

He later served as a consultant to the Japanese Ministry of Justice (司法省, Shihōshō) in 1918 and from 1922 to 1925, where he helped oversee the implementation of the Japanese legal codes. He died in Tokyo.

== Literary works ==
- Allgemeine Rechtslehre, 2 Vols. 1904
- Einführung in die Rechtswissenschaft, 1912
- Der Begriff der Philosophie, 1933
