= Český Šternberk =

- Market town
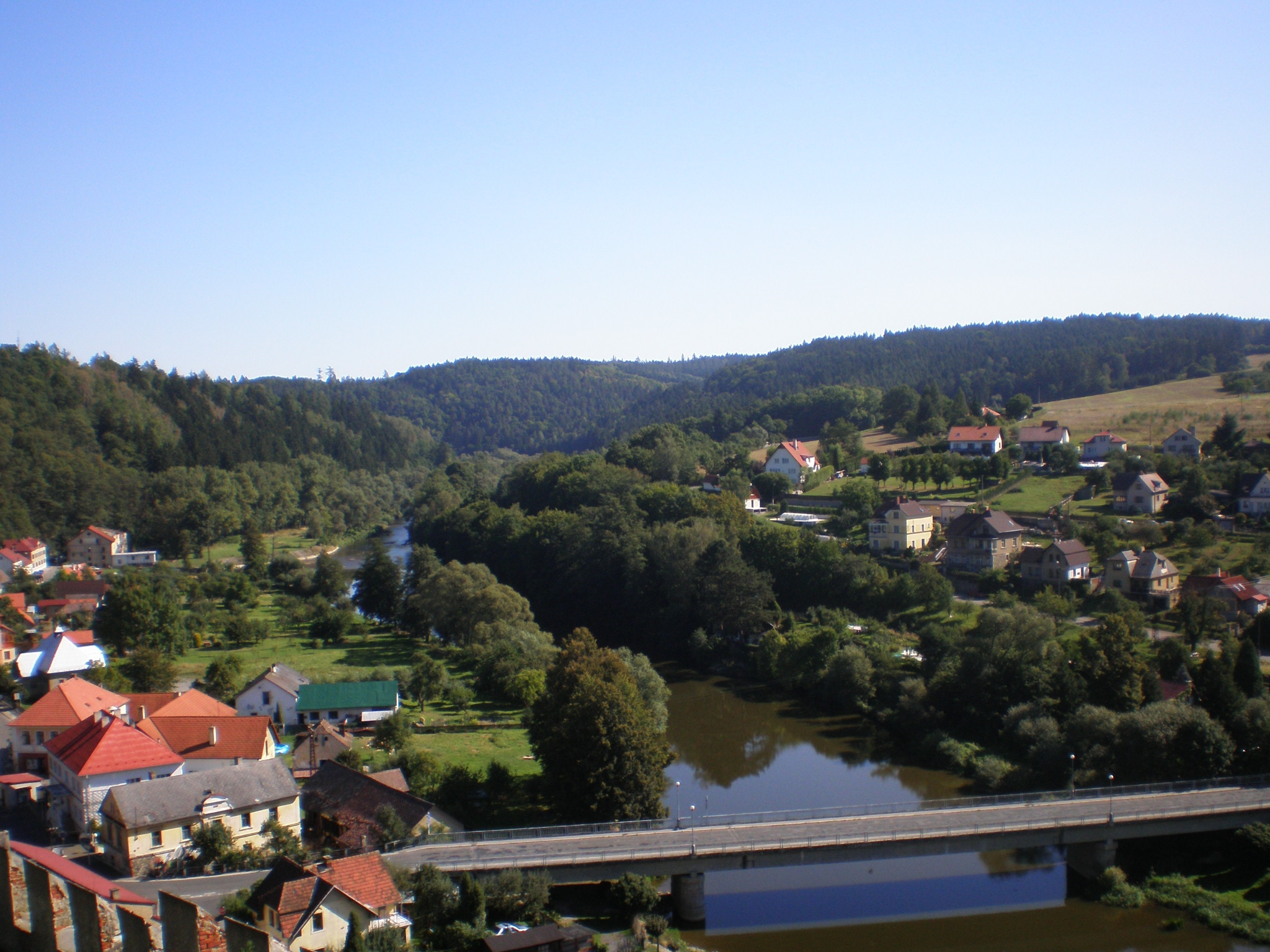
- View from the castle

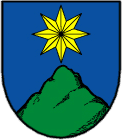
- Coat of arms

- Location in the Czech Republic
- Coordinates: 49°48′40″N 14°55′49″E
- Country: Czech Republic
- Region: Central Bohemian
- District: Benešov
- First mentioned: 1242

Area
  - Total: 5.47 km^{2} (2.11 sq mi)
- Elevation: 310 m (1,020 ft)

Population (2026-01-01)
  - Total: 179
  - Density: 32.7/km^{2} (84.8/sq mi)
- Time zone: UTC+1 (CET)
  - Summer (DST): UTC+2 (CEST)
- Postal code: 257 26
- Website: www.ceskysternberk.eu

Český Šternberk (Czech pronunciation: [ˈtʃɛskiː ˈʃtɛrnbɛrk]; German: Böhmisch Sternberg) is a market town in Benešov District in the Central Bohemian Region of the Czech Republic. It has about 200 inhabitants. It is known for the Český Šternberk Castle, located on the cliffs above the market town.

== Geography ==
Český Šternberk is located about 17 kilometres (11 mi) east of Benešov and 39 km (24 mi) southeast of Prague. It lies in the Vlašim Uplands. The highest point is a hill at 463 m (1,519 ft) above sea level. Český Šternberk is situated at a bend of the Sázava River. The Blanice forms the southern municipal border and flows into the Sázava.

== History ==
Český Šternberk Castle was founded around 1241 by Zdeslav of Divišov, later known as Zdeslav of Sternberg. The village was founded shortly after as a sub-castle settlement of the castle. The first written mention of the settlement is from 1242 and in 1654, it was first mentioned as a market town. Along with the castle, the settlement expanded to its present form and in 1901, it became linked by railway, which helped the development of tourism.

== Demographics ==
Historical population

Year	Pop.	±%
1869	494	—
1880	455	−7.9%
1890	453	−0.4%
1900	533	+17.7%
1910	395	−25.9%

Year	Pop.	±%
1921	422	+6.8%
1930	438	+3.8%
1950	332	−24.2%
1961	364	+9.6%
1970	274	−24.7%

Year	Pop.	±%
1980	215	−21.5%
1991	152	−29.3%
2001	150	−1.3%
2011	157	+4.7%
2021	169	+7.6%

Source: Censuses

== Transport ==
Český Šternberk is located on the railway line of local importance Ledeč nad Sázavou–Čerčany. The market town is served by two stops.

== Sights ==
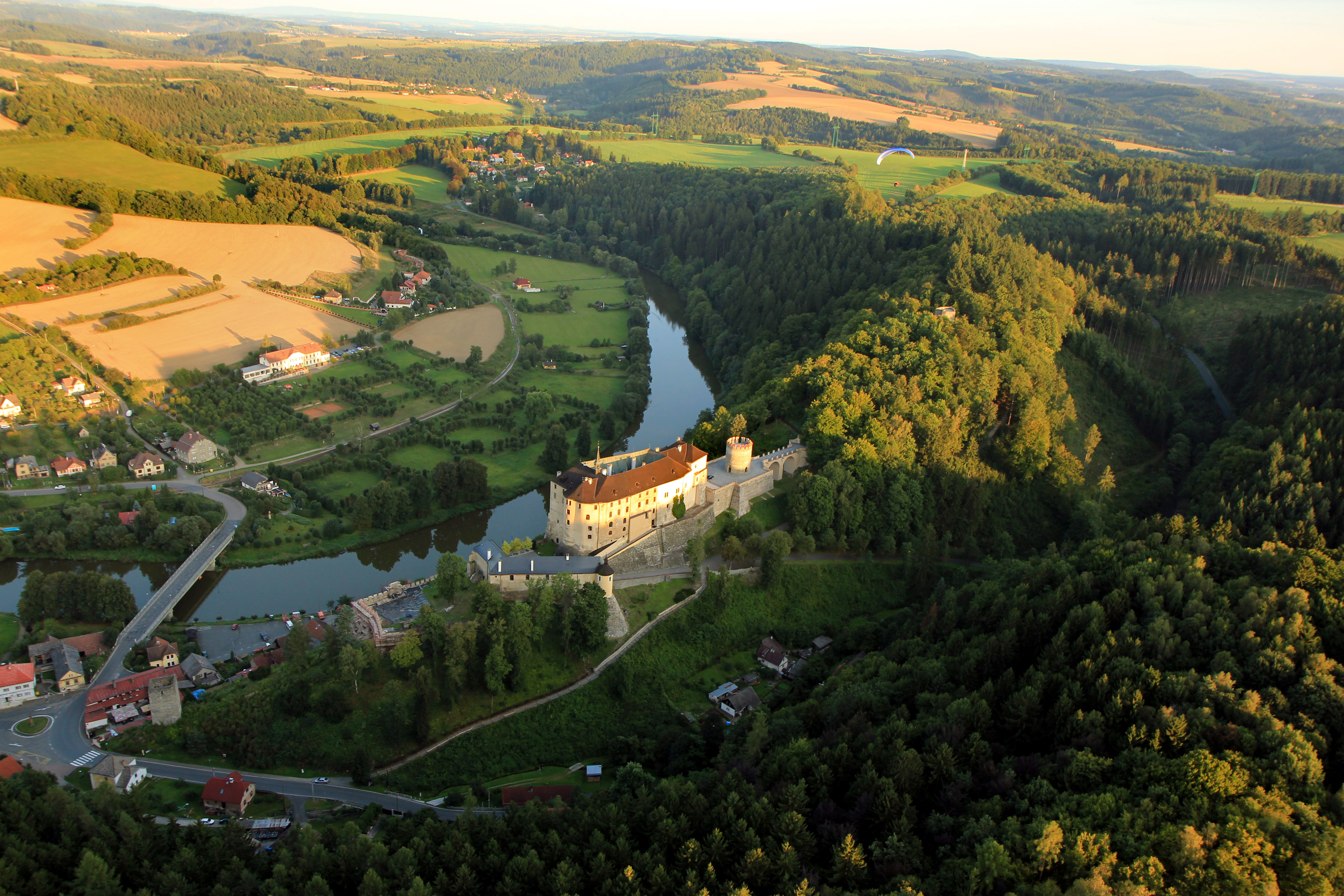
Aerial view of the castle and the bend of the river Sázava

The main landmark of the market town is the Český Šternberk Castle. It is one of oldest and most valuable aristocratic residences in the country, protected as a national cultural monument. Today it is open to the public and offers guided tours.

== Notable people ==
- Zdeněk Sternberg (1923–2021), count and owner of the castle; died here
