= Multiple cloning site =

Dense cluser of restriction sites in DNA

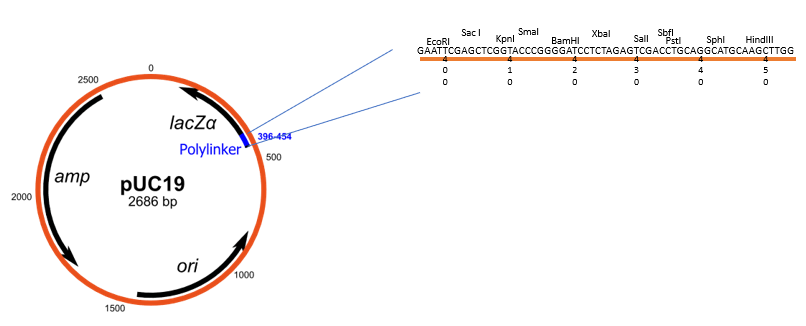
A pUC19 cloning vector showing the multiple cloning site sequence with restriction enzyme sites

A multiple cloning site (MCS), also called a polylinker, is a short segment of DNA which contains many (up to ~20) restriction sites—a standard feature of engineered plasmids. Restriction sites within an MCS are typically unique, occurring only once within a given plasmid. The purpose of an MCS in a plasmid is to allow a piece of DNA to be inserted into that region.

MCSs are found in a variety of vectors, including cloning vectors to increase the number of copies of target DNA, and in expression vectors to create a protein product. In expression vectors, the MCS is located downstream of a promoter to enable gene transcription. The MCS is often inserted within a non-essential gene, such as lacZα, facilitating blue-white screening for recombinant selection. By including recognition sequences for a variety of restriction enzymes, the MCS greatly enhances flexibility and efficiency in molecular cloning workflows, allowing for precise DNA insertion in synthetic biology, genetic engineering, and transgenic organism development.

== Creating a multiple cloning site ==
In some instances, a vector may not contain an MCS. Rather, an MCS can be added to a vector. The first step is designing complementary oligonucleotide sequences that contain restriction enzyme sites along with additional bases on the end that are complementary to the vector after digesting. Then the oligonucleotide sequences can be annealed and ligated into the digested and purified vector. The digested vector is cut with a restriction enzyme that complements the oligonucleotide insert overhangs. After ligation, transform the vector into bacteria and verify the insert by sequencing. This method can also be used to add new restriction sites to a multiple cloning site.

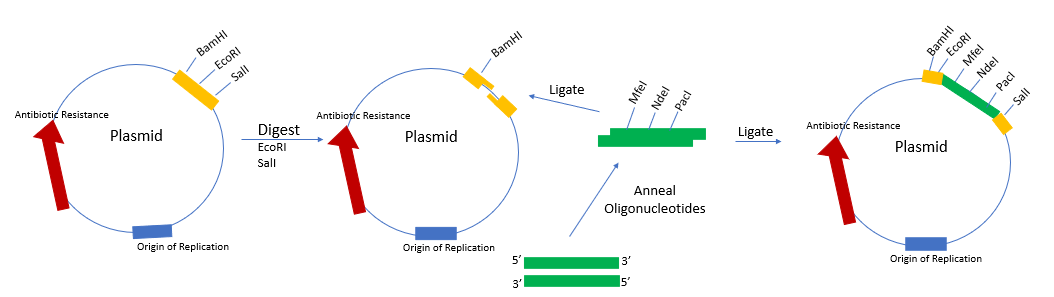
A diagram showing the process of inserting a multiple cloning site into a plasmid vector

== Design Considerations for Multiple Cloning Sites ==
Multiple cloning sites are strategically designed to maximize flexibility while maintaining vector integrity. The primary consideration is the inclusion of unique restriction enzyme recognition sequences, meaning each restriction site appears only once in the plasmid backbone to prevent off-target cleavage during digestion. These enzymes are chosen to offer a range of cutting options (e.g., blunt vs. sticky ends), and their recognition sites are confirmed not to appear in essential vector elements or the insert sequence itself to avoid undesired fragmentation.

Directional cloning is another key design strategy, using two different restriction enzymes flanking the insert region to ensure the gene is integrated in a single orientation. This method minimizes the need to screen for orientation, which would otherwise be necessary in non-directional cloning using a single restriction site.

For expression vectors, MCSs are often placed in frame with N- or C-terminal tags, ensuring that inserted coding sequences remain in the correct open reading frame. Extra nucleotides may be added to maintain reading frame continuity, especially in fusion protein constructs. Additionally, short buffer sequences flanking restriction sites help improve enzyme activity by giving enough DNA for proper binding and cleavage.

== Uses ==
Multiple cloning sites are a feature that allows for the insertion of foreign DNA without disrupting the rest of the plasmid which makes it extremely useful in biotechnology, bioengineering, and molecular genetics. MCS can aid in making transgenic organisms, more commonly known as a genetically modified organism (GMO) using genetic engineering. To take advantage of the MCS in genetic engineering, a gene of interest has to be added to the vector during production when the MCS is cut open. After the MCS is made and ligated it will include the gene of interest and can be amplified to increase gene copy number in a bacterium-host. After the bacterium replicates, the gene of interest can be extracted out of the bacterium. In some instances, an expression vector can be used to create a protein product. After the products are isolated, they have a wide variety of uses such as the production of insulin, the creation of vaccines, production of antibiotics, and creation of gene therapies.

== Challenges and Limitations in MCS Utilization ==
Despite their utility, multiple cloning sites present several limitations. A common issue is the limited availability of unique restriction sites compatible with both the vector and the insert. If an insert gene contains internal recognition sequences for enzymes in the MCS, it may be cut during digestion, necessitating site-directed mutagenesis or alternative cloning strategies.

Additionally, the presence of multiple adjacent restriction sites can sometimes form secondary structures such as hairpins or stem-loops in the mRNA transcript. These structures, especially in the 5' untranslated region (UTR), may interfere with ribosome binding and reduce translation efficiency of the inserted gene.

Another limitation lies in sequence context variability. Inserts cloned at different restriction sites within the same MCS may end up with different upstream or downstream untranslated regions, affecting mRNA stability, transcription termination, or protein expression. Some MCS designs have also been found to unintentionally introduce cryptic regulatory sequences or frameshifts, especially when modifying or stacking inserts, which can hinder reproducibility across experiments.

== Structural features in vector types ==
MCSs have distinct structural features depending on the type of vector in which they are used.

In cloning vectors, MCSs are typically placed within a selection marker, such as the lacZα gene in pUC vectors. This configuration allows for efficient screening for recombinant plasmids because the insertion of foreign DNA into the MCS inactivates the marker gene, allowing for blue-white screening or other selection methods. The MCS in this region provides many restriction sites that can be utilized to enable the insertion of foreign DNA into the vector. Upon this insertion, the continuity of selection marker is disrupted, making it non-functional, and allowing selection for insertion. A gene of interest is inserted into the MCS in this type of vector, and is then subsequently transferred into bacteria to be reproduced and propagated. This vector allows for rapid accumulation of specific DNA sequences for experimental use.

In expression vectors, MCSs are placed between a promoter and a terminator in order to regulate gene expression. The upstream promoter can be either constitutive or inducible and can respond to specific chemical inducers, while the downstream terminator facilitates proper termination of transcription and enhances plasmid stability. The MCS in this type of vector allows the insertion of a gene of interest for subsequent expression (transcription and translation). Being between a promoter and terminator sequence, the placement of the MCS between facilitates the creation of a functionally expressed gene, with initiation and termination sequences. These vectors are prepared and inserted into prokaryotic or eukaryotic cells to induce expression of particular genes within that cell.

In reporter vectors, an MCS is typically placed near a reporter gene, for example, a fluorescent protein (GFP), luciferase, or lacZ. This allows promoter sequences to be added to the MCS to facilitate the study of promoter activity and gene regulation by monitoring reporter gene expression. The MCS allows for easy and flexible insertions of different promoter types, which can then be used to study levels of expression of the reporter gene to understand dynamics of specific promoters.

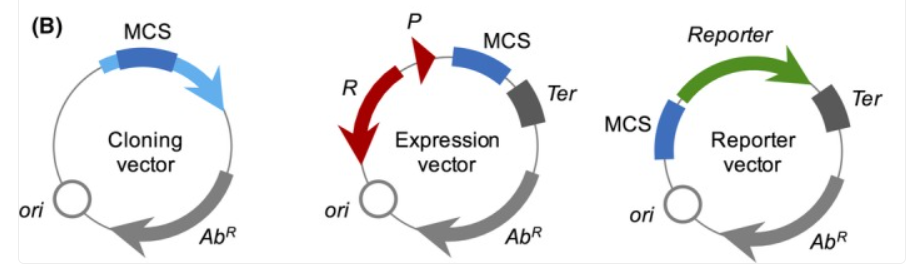
Multiple cloning sire orientation in different bacterial plasmid architectures. From "The art of vector engineering: towards the construction of next-generation genetic tools". Shown is section B from figure 2.

== Integration of MCS in Viral Vectors for Gene Therapy ==
Multiple cloning sites are widely used in viral vectors to facilitate the insertion of therapeutic genes. In adeno-associated virus (AAV) vectors, an MCS is typically inserted between the promoter and polyadenylation signal within the inverted terminal repeats (ITRs), allowing seamless cloning of genes of interest for tissue-specific expression.

Lentiviral vectors, commonly used for stable gene delivery in dividing and non-dividing cells, often feature a central MCS to accommodate diverse inserts, including fluorescent reporters, transcription factors, or shRNA expression cassettes. The presence of an MCS allows rapid customization of lentiviral backbones without requiring vector redesign, enhancing the versatility of gene therapy approaches.

Additionally, adenoviral shuttle plasmids contain MCS regions that replace deleted E1 or E3 regions of the viral genome, facilitating insertion of transgenes. These modular plasmids are recombined with adenoviral backbones to generate replication-deficient vectors. The MCS thereby functions as a universal insertion site across diverse viral delivery systems.

== Historical Background ==
=== Early Developments of Cloning Vectors ===
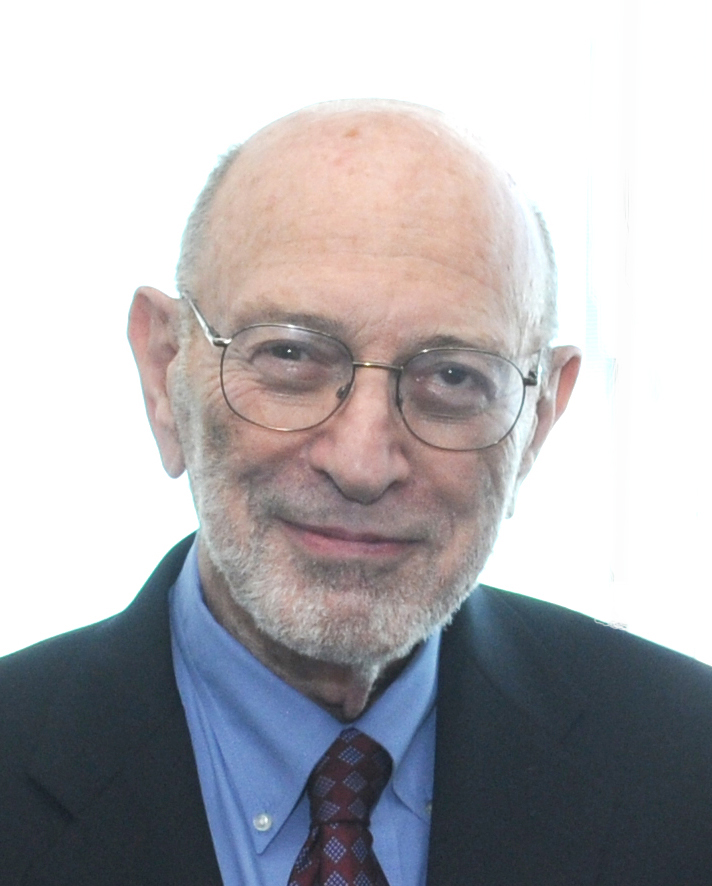
Stanley Norman Cohen 2016 "Stanley Norman Cohen DSC 2027" by Otha deWayne Howse is licensed under CC BY-SA 3.0.

Stanley N. Cohen and Herbert W. Boyer conducted experiments in 1973 demonstrating that genes from a different species could be inserted into bacterial cells and expressed. They employed the plasmid pSC101, a naturally occurring plasmid from the bacterial species Salmonella panama, which they altered to have a single EcoRI restriction site and a tetracycline resistance gene. The pSC101 plasmid did not have a formal multiple cloning site, but its design highlighted the utility of restriction sites for gene insertion, being the foundation for expanding restriction enzyme constructs in vectors to increase flexibility of cloning sites.

=== Introduction of pBR322 and Enhanced Cloning Sites ===
From previous research, in 1977, scientists Francisco Bolivar and Raymond L. Rodriguez, built the pBR322 plasmid. While not being officially a multiple cloning site, this plasmid was one of the first vectors to have more than one unique restriction site. The sites were inserted into a strategic location in its sequence, such as in antibiotic resistance gene or lacZ, where they could be used for insertional inactivation to identify recombinant clones. This introduced greater flexibility in the insertion of foreign DNA fragments and marked a considerable progression toward having designated MCS regions in future vectors, such as the pUC sites.

=== Construction of pUC Vectors and Formal Definition of MCS ===
The pUC vector series was built in 1982 by Jeffrey Vieira and Joachim Messing, starting from M13mp7. The vectors had a particular region defined as having numerous independent restriction sites and formally defining the concept of the MCS. The pUC vectors facilitated sequencing and cloning, significantly enhancing the molecular cloning procedure.

== Modern design and optimization of the MCS ==
Present advancements in MCS design have made cloning more efficient, flexible, and easy to perform, which makes them frequently used in molecular biology.

=== Advances in MCS Design for Synthetic Biology ===
Modern synthetic biology has driven innovations in MCS architecture to enable modular and scalable genetic assembly. The BioBrick standard pioneered the use of flanking restriction sites (e.g., EcoRI, XbaI, SpeI, PstI) to standardize part junctions, allowing genetic elements like promoters, genes, and terminators to be interchangeably cloned into a common framework. Building on this, newer systems such as Modular Cloning (MoClo) and Golden Gate Assembly use Type IIS restriction enzymes that cut outside their recognition sites, enabling scarless and directional insertion of multiple parts in a single reaction. These systems typically design MCS regions with flanking BsaI or BsmBI sites to enable seamless multi-part assembly.

Some platforms have introduced universal MCSs, optimized short sequences flanked by homology arms or unique sites that enable compatibility across vector backbones, expression hosts, or assembly methods. Such modularity streamlines cloning workflows, reduces errors, and improves standardization across synthetic biology labs.

=== MCS design ===
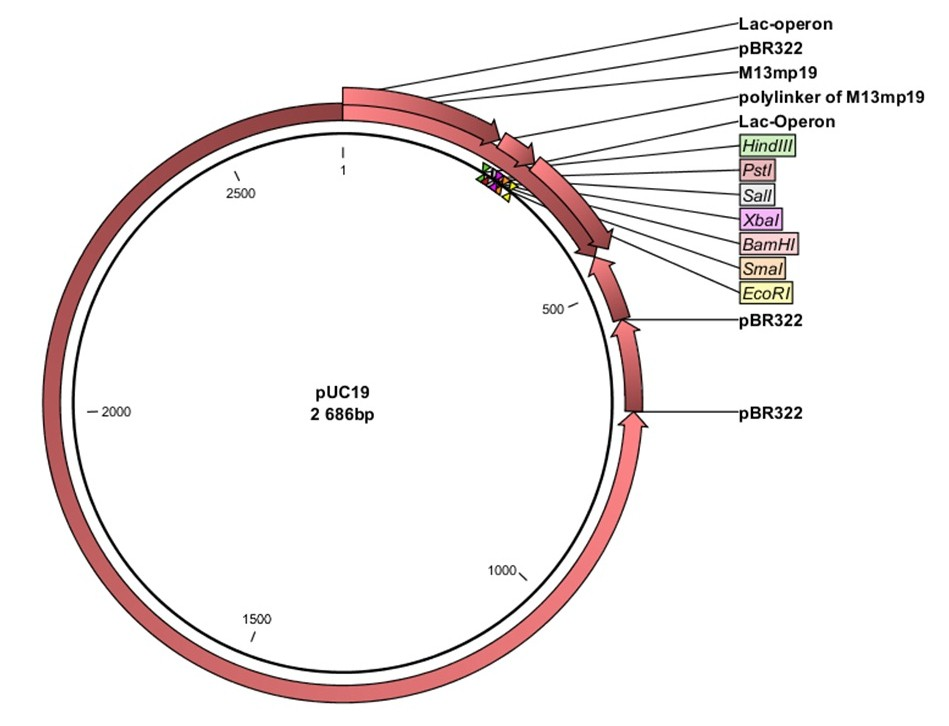
pUC19 plasmid showing MCS

Restriction site placement and strategic selection in MCSs optimize flexibility and compatibility and reduce potential cloning issues. Also facilitating greater workability and versatility for accommodating a vast range of experiments and applications. In an MCS, the occurrence of multiple unique restriction sites in proximity allow for less constraints on enzyme selection. Such a design enables enzymatic cleavage at specific positions, enabling specific MCS insertions and changes for various applications. Widely used plasmids such as pUC19 and other pUC plasmids have purposefully placed restriction sites in the MCS to facilitate effective cloning, contributing to the flexibility of MCS in molecular use.

=== Removal of undesirable restriction sites ===
Improvements in bioinformatics and molecular techniques enable identification and elimination of undesirable restriction sites, thus streamlining the process of cloning. Bioinformatic tools assist in screening and identification of unwanted restriction sites in an MCS or vector backbone. Unwanted restriction sites have the potential to cause significant variation in protein expression depending on their position, and some impose very sharp restriction of expression of a gene of interest if located in the MCS. By hitting and removing these problematic sites, researchers are able to create MCSs to obtain uniform and effective protein expression.

=== Modularity and flexibility ===
Modern MCSs are designed with modularity in mind, making it easier to integrate and swap out genetic elements, which is particularly beneficial in the field of synthetic biology. Standardized flanking genetic sequences in MCS construction allow easy replacement of the genetic elements. Modular design enables rapid assembly and customization of vectors for specific research needs. The MoClo system allows for efficient assembly of DNA fragments into multigene constructs with a modular design. The system allows ease of coupling DNA fragments (unwanted sequences-free) to make the process size-effective and efficient. For example, the MoClo system allows for efficient coupling of two genes, e.g., a promoter sequence and a coding sequence, each from different MCSs, into a single multigene construct without incorporating unwanted sequences.

=== Compatibility with advanced cloning technologies ===
Contemporary MCSs are designed to be compatible with advanced cloning technologies, enhancing the accuracy and efficiency of the genetic manipulations. Contemporary MCS designs facilitate such technologies as Gibson Assembly, Golden Gate cloning and Universal MCS that have advantages over the traditional restriction enzyme-based protocols, such as parallel assembly of multiple DNA pieces. Such compatibility enhances the efficiency and usefulness of the MCS region. This compatibility is essential in genetic engineering and synthetic biology, in which the effective and precise assembly of various genetic components is essential to construct intricate genetic circuits or metabolic pathways.

=== Optimizing sequence context ===
Strict attention to sequence context near MCSs ensures effective cloning and proper gene expression. Elimination of secondary structures that are possible between DNA components in the MCS (such as promoters and open reading frames) prevents interference with restriction enzyme activity and optimizes MCS functionality. Secondary structures within the 5' untranslated region, for instance, can prevent ribosome binding, reducing translation efficiency of an inserted gene. In addition, preventing the additional placement of early stop codons and preventing the interruption of reading frames eliminates undesirable transcription or translational errors, such as premature stop codons that may truncate the protein product, further optimizing MCS reliability in vectors.

=== Challenges and limitations ===
Despite optimizations and advancements, certain challenges persist in MCS design, necessitating ongoing research and innovation. One of these issues is the occurrence of internal restriction sites in genes or vectors, which can interfere with restriction enzyme activity and cloning efficiency. Furthermore, the structural environment of MCSs can confer unintended regulatory properties. For instance, MCSs inserted too far away from promoter regions can result in secondary structure formation, interfering with expression of a gene in an MCS. In addition, sequence context variability (e.g., differences in proximity to promoters or proximal regulatory elements) can lead to uneven gene expression. This variability arises as a result of variations in the surrounding sequences, which can interfere with transcription efficiency, mRNA stability, or initiation of translation. In order to minimize such variability, innovations beyond are needed to engineer standardized MCS designs that yield uniform performance in diverse genetic constructs.

== Example ==
One bacterial plasmid used in genetic engineering as a plasmid cloning vector is pUC18. Its polylinker region is composed of several restriction enzyme recognition sites, that have been engineered into a single cluster (the polylinker). It has restriction sites for various restriction enzymes, including EcoRI, BamHI, and PstI. Another vector used in genetic engineering is pUC19, which is similar to pUC18, but its polylinker region is reversed. E.coli is also commonly used as the bacterial host because of the availability, quick growth rate, and versatility. An example of a plasmid cloning vector which modifies the inserted protein is pFUSE-Fc plasmid.

In order to genetically engineer insulin, the first step is to cut the MCS in the plasmid being used. Once the MCS is cut, the gene for human insulin can be added making the plasmid genetically modified. After that, the genetically modified plasmid is put into the bacterial host and allowed to divide. To make the large supply that is demanded, the host cells are put into a large fermentation tank that is an optimal environment for the host. The process is finished by filtering out the insulin from the host. Purification can then take place so the insulin can be packaged and distributed to individuals with diabetes.

== Application of MCS in CRISPR-Based Technologies ==
Multiple cloning sites play a central role in CRISPR gene editing systems. Many CRISPR-Cas9 plasmids feature MCSs immediately downstream of the U6 promoter, flanked by Type IIS restriction sites like BbsI or BsmBI. This design allows efficient insertion of synthetic oligonucleotides encoding 20-nucleotide single-guide RNA for targeted editing.

CRISPR multiplexing often relies on tandem MCSs, where multiple single-guide RNA expression cassettes are cloned into a single vector. Using Golden Gate or Gibson Assembly methods, multiple guides can be inserted via standardized MCSs, enabling simultaneous gene knockout or regulation of several loci.

Additionally, CRISPR plasmids used for homology-directed repair (HDR) frequently contain MCSs for inserting donor templates, such as fluorescent reporters or epitope tags. The presence of an MCS enables precise control over insert composition and position, making it easier to customize genome editing vectors for complex experiments.
