= Raymond L. Rodriguez =

American professor of biology

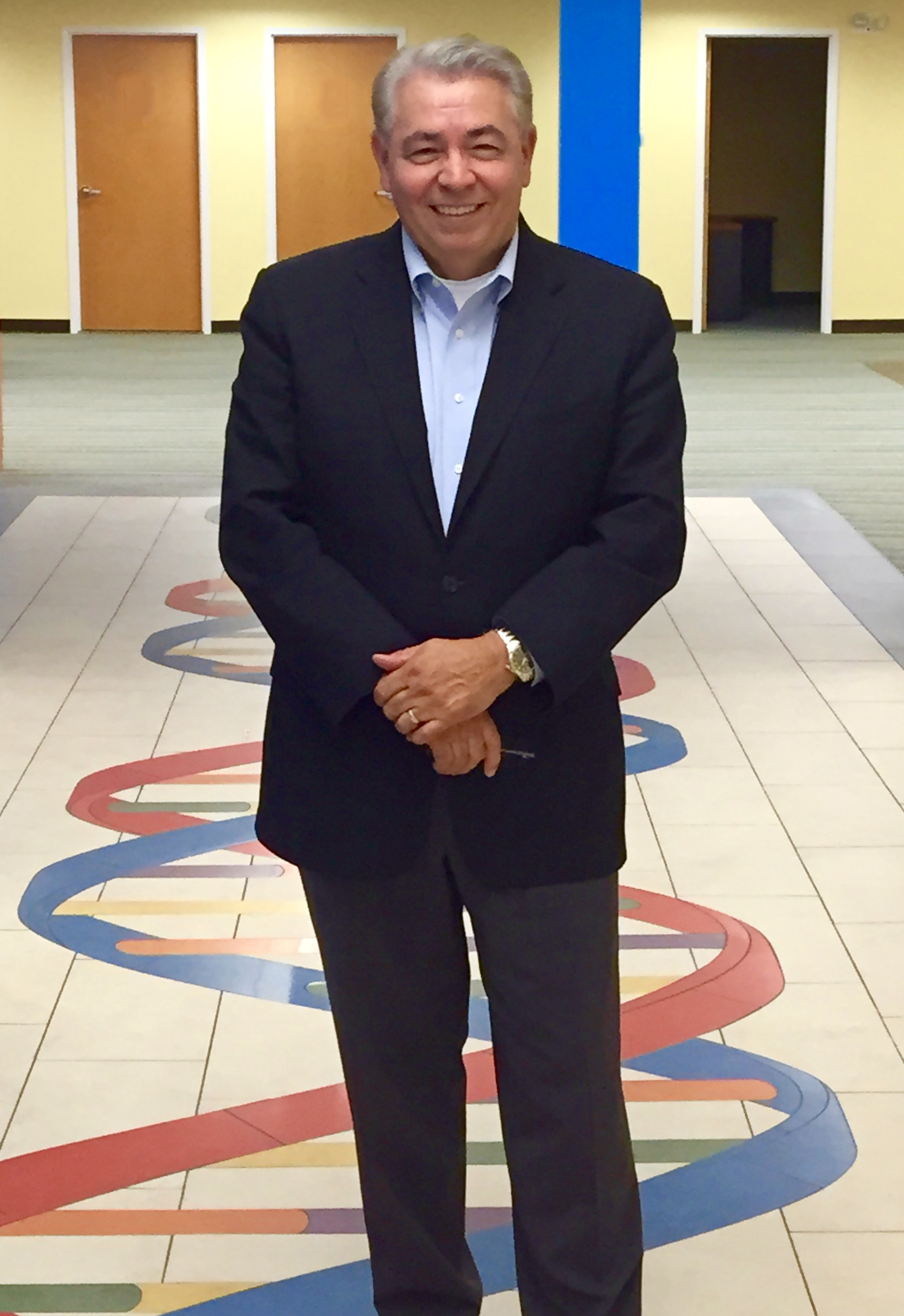
- Born: 1947 (age 78–79); Fresno, California
- Title: Professor, Scientist, Inventor, Entrepreneur

Raymond L. Rodriguez (born 1947) is an American professor of biology, specializing in molecular biology, genomics and biotechnology. His current research interests include diet-genome interactions, plant-made pharmaceuticals and the food/brain axis. Rodriguez is also an inventor, and entrepreneur. His research at the University of California, San Francisco in the 1970s helped lay the foundation for the biotechnology industry. He also holds several issued US patents. He is involved in programs that promote diversity, equity and inclusion for women and underrepresented minorities in science, technology, engineering, and mathematics (STEM) disciplines.

== Early life and education ==
The son of migrant farm workers, Rodriguez was born in 1947 in Fresno, California and raised in San Joaquin and Kerman, California. In 1965, he graduated from Kerman Union High School. After graduating from Fresno City College, he received a Bachelor of Science degree in biology from California State University, Fresno in 1969 and in the following year he entered the PhD program at the University of California, Santa Cruz. Under the supervision of professor Cedric Davern, Rodriguez produced visual autoradiographic evidence for bidirectional replication of the E. coli chromosome. While a UC Santa Cruz graduate student, Rodriguez received a research fellowship from the Ford Foundation in 1973.

== Post-doctoral research ==
After receiving his PhD in 1974, Rodriguez was awarded an A.P. Giannini postdoctoral fellowship to work with professor Herbert W. Boyer in the department of microbiology at the University of California San Francisco Medical Center. In Boyer's laboratory, Rodriguez collaborated with postdoctoral fellow, Francisco Bolivar Zapata (Paco), to construct more efficient and better characterized cloning vectors. Together, they constructed the 4,361 base pair, circular, autonomously replicating, DNA molecule, pBR322, the first general purpose molecular cloning vector approved by the National Institute of Health Guidelines. The abbreviation, “pBR322,” refers to the plasmid “p,” constructed by Bolivar and Rodriguez “BR,” and the last of “322” transformed colonies to be screened for the pBR322 plasmid. The 1977 publication describing the construction of pBR322 has been cited more than 6,000 times. Soon after its approval by the NIH, pBR322 was used to clone and express the first chemically synthesized gene for the human peptide hormone, somatostatin. The following year, researchers at Harvard University used pBR322 to clone and express rat proinsulin. The main components of pBR322 can be found in many other plasmid vectors, particularly the pUC plasmids designed and constructed by professor Joachim Messing.

In 1976 Rodriguez received fellowships from the National Cancer Institute and the UC President's postdoctoral fellowship program to support plasmid vector research and development.

== Career ==
In 1977, Rodriguez joined the faculty of the University of California, Davis, department of molecular and cellular biology (formerly the genetics department). There, he developed specialized promoter-probe cloning vectors to better understand the regulation of bacterial transcription. In 1998 he received the Distinguished Service Award from the UC Davis College of Agricultural and Environmental Sciences and later their Outstanding Faculty Advisor Award (1992) and the Principles of Community Award (2012), from the UC Davis College of Biological Science.

In 1990, as a member of the Physical Mapping Group, Rodriguez gained experience with genomics by participating in the cloning and mapping of the human APOE gene on chromosome 19 at the Lawrence Livermore National Laboratory Shortly thereafter, he created the International Rice Genome Organization, an ad hoc organization of genomics and agriculture experts to develop a strategy for sequencing the rice genome. This strategy was later used by the Japanese Ministry of Agriculture, Forestry and Fisheries. The first draft of the rice genome was released on April 5, 2002.

In January 2003, Rodriguez received funds from the National Institute on Minority Health and Health Disparities to create a Center of Excellence for Nutritional Genomics. The center was a collaborative effort with the Children's Hospital of Oakland Research Institute. Rodriguez served as center director until 2009.

From 2007 to 2008, he chaired the committee of visitors for the National Science Foundation (NSF) Directorate for Biological Sciences, Plant Genome Research, 3-Year Program Review which assessed the impact of plant genome sequencing on plant biology research.

In 2008 Rodriguez was a distinguished lecturer for the USDA-ARS Beltsville Center.

In 2009, Rodriguez received an honorary Doctorate of Science, from Nara Institute of Science and Technology, Nara, Japan

In 2010, Rodriguez, with the help of professor Somen Nandi, formed Global HealthShare Initiative (GHS), an outreach and knowledge dissemination program. As GHS's executive director, and vice president of Humanity Beyond Barriers, he helped organized international health projects in India, Bangladesh, and Rwanda.

In 2012, the Defense Advanced Research Project Agency (DARPA) funded Rodriguez to engineer a plant-made human butyrylcholinesterase (BuChE), an enzyme used to treat the effects of chemical warfare agents, like sarin gas. Using the fermentation of rice cells transformed with the human BuChE gene, the plant-made enzyme was found to be as effective as human-sourced BuChE in neutralizing sarin.

In 2015, he was an invited presenter to the President's Council of Advisors on Science and Technology (PCAST).

In 2016, Rodriguez was elected a Fellow of the American Association for the Advancement of Science.

In 2018, Rodriguez received the Outstanding Alumni award from Fresno State University, College of Science & Mathematics and was appointed a Distinguish Collaborative Research Professor at Osaka University.

In 2019, Rodriguez directed an interdisciplinary research collaboration project involving the University of California, Davis, Osaka University and Kirin Holdings Co, Japan to use plant cell fermentation to produce safe, effective and affordable human growth factors for stem cell cures.

On June 16, 2021, Osaka University awarded him an honorary degree in recognition of his contributions 'in building the relationship between the two universities, promoting educational exchange, and performing educational and research activity'.

== Research discoveries and accomplishments ==
As assistant professor in the UC Davis Department of Genetics, Rodriguez published two edited volumes entitled “Promoters: Structure and Function” in 1982 with M.J. Chamberlin and “Vectors: A Survey of Molecular Cloning Vectors,” in 1987 with D.T. Denhardt. During this period, Rodriguez developed the first molecular cloning lab course in the nation for undergraduates and graduate students. The course was accompanied by a laboratory manual entitled “Recombinant DNA Techniques: An Introduction” co-authored with Dr. Robert C. Tait.

In addition to his research and development of plasmid vectors, Rodriguez also developed a research program to understand the physiological and molecular processes of rice (Oryza sativa). Rodriguez investigated the molecular biology of rice gene systems related to seed germination. This research resulted in the cloning and sequencing of the rice alpha-amylase multigene family. One of the outcomes of this research was the use of alpha-amylase gene promoters to express human proteins in transgenic rice cells. These findings resulted in eighteen issued US patents.

As executive director of the Center of Excellence for Nutritional Genomics, Rodriguez coordinated the research activities of over 50 research faculty, physicians, postdoctoral fellows and graduate students to investigate diet-gene interactions. Center researchers published over 200 research publications and two volumes on diet-gene interactions and their relationship to human health and disease. These included, Nutrigenomics: Discovering the Path to Personalized Nutrition with Dr. Jim Kaput and Nutritional Genomics: Impact of Dietary Regulation of Gene Function on Human Disease with professor Wayne Bidlack. In addition to his duties as center director, Rodriguez maintained a research program to investigate the role of dietary factors capable of promoting epigenetic changes on genes related to cancer risk.

== Diversity, inclusion, equity ==
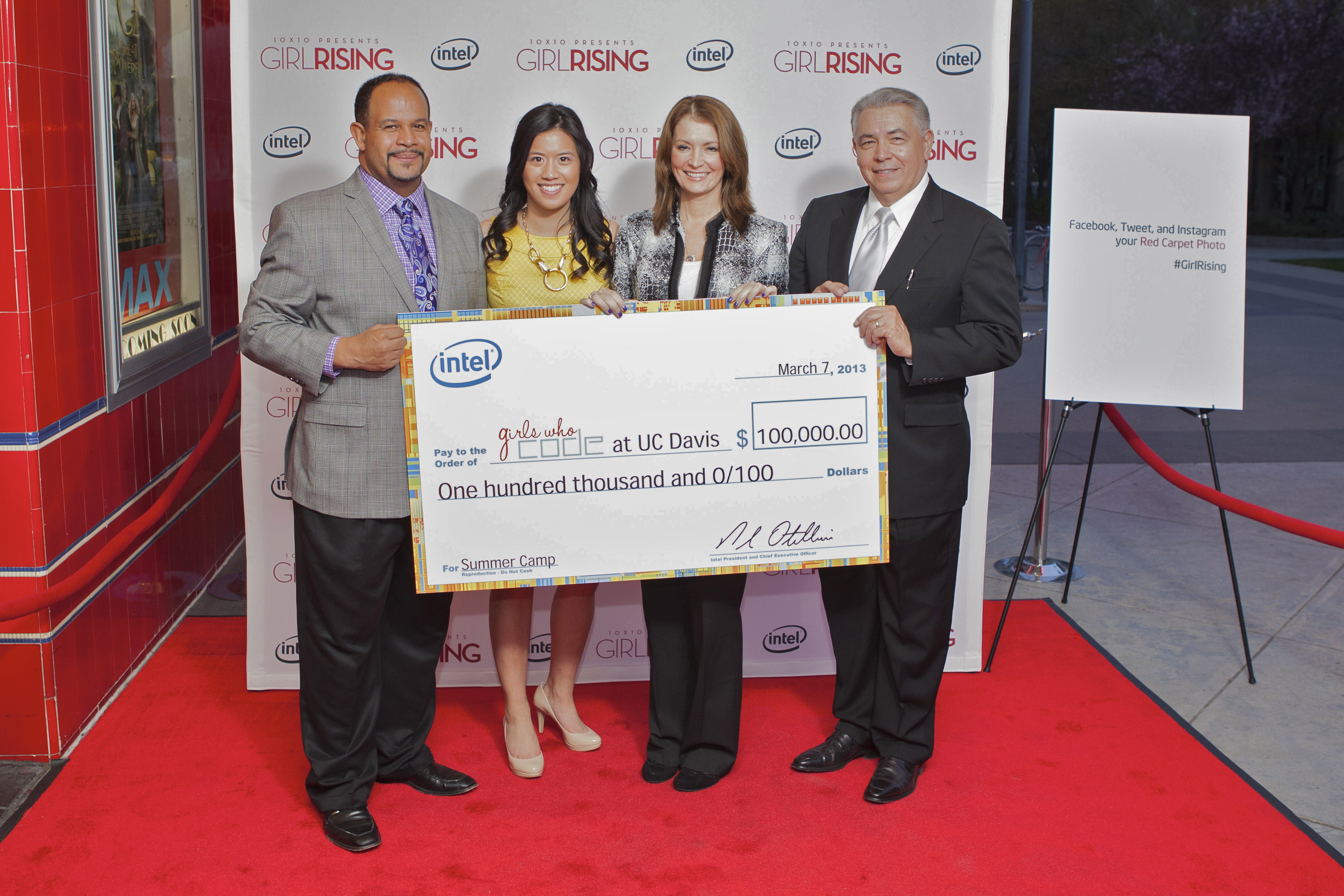

Throughout his career, Rodriguez provided educational and research opportunities for racial/ethnic minorities (REM) and women in STEM. From 1980 to 1994, he provided research experiences for REMs and women from various California State Universities, NIH MBRS/MARC programs, and select HBCUs around the U.S.. From 1990 to 1993, Rodriguez served as Associate Dean in the UC Davis Office of Graduate Studies. He then organized "Professors for the Future," a mentoring program for diverse, high performing graduate students interested in careers in academia. From 2001 to 2002, Rodriguez served as a member and eventually chair of the Advisory Council, for the National Institute for Minority Health and Health Disparities. From 2005 to 2016 Rodriguez served as a member of the Building Interdisciplinary Research Careers in Women's Health (BIRCWH) program at the UC Davis Medical Center. In 2016, he was a member of the UC Davis NIH Postbaccalaureate Research Education Program (PREP) Internal Advisory and Steering Committees. From 2012 to 2017, Rodriguez served as co-principal investigator and member of the NSF ADVANCE/ CAMPOS program designed to increase the number of REM women faculty members in STEM departments at UC Davis. In 2013, Rodriguez received funding from Intel Corporation to organize the first Girls Who Code summer immersion course on a university campus. The Girls Who Code program is designed to close the gender gap in the computer sciences.

== Selected publications ==
- Rodriguez, R.L., M.S. Dalbey and C.I. Davern. 1973. Autoradiographic evidence for bidirectional DNA replication in E. coli. J. Mol. Biol. 74:599–604.
- Bolivar, F., R.L. Rodriguez, P.J. Greene, M.C. Betlach, H.L. Heyneker, Boyer H.W. Crosa, J.H. S. Falkow. 1977. Construction and characterization of new cloning vehicles. II. A multipurpose cloning system. Gene, 2:95.
- Neve, R.L., R.W. West and R.L. Rodriguez. 1979. Eukaryotic DNA fragments which act as promoters for a plasmid gene. Nature 277:324–325.
- West, R.W., Jr. and R.L. Rodriguez. 1980. Construction and characterization of E. coli promoter-probe plasmid vectors. II. RNA polymerase binding studies on antibiotic-resistance promoters. Gene. 9:175–193.
- Goldfarb, D.S., R.H. Doi and R. L. Rodriguez. 1981. Expression of Tn9-derived chloramphenicol resistance in Bacillus subtilis. Nature 293:309–311.
- Goldfarb, D.S., R.L. Rodriguez and R.H. Doi. 1982. Translational block to expression of the E. coli Tn9-derived chloramphenicol-resistance gene in Bacillus subtilis Proc. Natl. Acad. Sci. USA. 79:5886–5890.
- Karrer, E.E. and Rodriguez, R.L. 1992. Metabolic regulation of rice alpha-amylase and sucrose synthase genes in planta. The Plant Journal, 2(4):517–523.
- Huang, N., Stebbins, G.L. and Rodriguez, R.L. 1992. Classification and evolution of alpha-amylase genes in plants. Proc. Natl. Acad. Sci. USA, 89:7526–7530.
- Mitsunaga, S., Rodriguez, R.L. and Yamaguchi, J. 1994. Sequence-specific interactions of a nuclear protein factor with the promoter of a rice gene for alpha-amylase, RAamy3D.. Nucl. Acids Res. 22:1948–1953.
- Itoh, K., Yamaguchi, J. Huang, N., Rodriguez, R.L., Akazawa, T. and Shimamoto, K. 1995. Developmental and Hormonal Regulation of Rice -Amylase (RAmy1A)-gusA Fusion Genes in Transgenic Rice Seeds. Plant Physiol. 107: 25–31.
- Terashima, M., Murai, Y., Kawamura, M., Nakanishi, S., Stoltz, T. Chen, L., Drohan, W., Rodriguez, R.L. and Katoh, S. 1999. Production of functional human alpha-1-antitrypsin in plant cell culture. Applied Microbial Biotechnology. 52:516-516.
- Galvez, A.F., Huang, L., Magbanua, M.M.J. Dawson, K. R. L. Rodriguez. 2011. Differential Expression of Thrombospondin (THBS1) in Turmorigenic and Nontumorigenic Prostate Epithelial Cells in Response to a Chromatin-Binding Soy Peptide. Nutrition and Cancer 63(4):623–636.
- Alkanaimsh, S., Karuppanan, K., Guerrero, A., Tu, A., Hashimoto, B., Hwang, M-S, Phu, M., Arzola, L., Lebrilla, C., M. Dandekar, A., Falk, B.W., Nandi, N., Rodriguez, R.L., and McDonald, K. 2016. Transient Expression of Tetrameric Recombinant Human Butyrylcholinesterase in Nicotiana benthamiana. Frontiers in Plant Science,16:7:743.
- Chiu, S-C, Chao, C-Y, Chiang, E-P, I., Syu, J-N, Rodriguez, R.L., Tang, F-T, 2017. N-3 polyunsaturated fatty acids alleviate high glucose-mediated dysfunction of endothelial progenitor cells and prevent ischemic injuries both in vitro and in vivo. J. Nutr. Biochem. 42:172–181.
- Rodriguez. R.L., Albeck, J.G., Taha, A.Y., Ori-McKenney, K.M., Recanzone, G.H., Stradleigh, T.W., Hernandez, B.C., Nord, A.S., Tang, F-Y, Chiang, E-P and Cruz-Orengo, L. 2017. Impact of Diet-derived Signaling Molecules on Human Cognition: Exploring the Food-Brain Axis. npj Science of Food, 1:1–11.
- Jaggers, G.K., Watkins, B. A., and R. L. Rodriguez. 2020. Nutrition Research, COVID-19: repositioning nutrition research for the next pandemic, 18:1–6.
- Rodriguez, R.L., Tait, R. C. 1983. Recombinant DNA techniques: An introduction. 16.95.
