= Transformation efficiency =

Ability of a cell to take up DNA

Transformation efficiency refers to the ability of a cell to take up and incorporate exogenous DNA, such as plasmids, during a process called transformation. The efficiency of transformation is typically measured as the number of transformants (cells that have taken up the exogenous DNA) per microgram of DNA added to the cells. A higher transformation efficiency means that more cells are able to take up the DNA, and a lower efficiency means that fewer cells are able to do so.

In molecular biology, transformation efficiency is a crucial parameter, it is used to evaluate the ability of different methods to introduce plasmid DNA into cells and to compare the efficiency of different plasmid, vectors and host cells. This efficiency can be affected by a number of factors, including the method used for introducing the DNA, the type of cell and plasmid used, and the conditions under which the transformation is performed. Therefore, measuring and optimizing transformation efficiency is an important step in many molecular biology applications, including genetic engineering, gene therapy and biotechnology.

== Measurement ==
By measuring the transformation efficiency, we can utilize the information from our experiment to evaluate how effectively our transformation went. This is a quantification of how many cells were altered by 1 μg of plasmid DNA. In essence, it is a sign that the transformation experiment was successful. It should be determined under conditions of cell excess.

Transformation efficiency is typically measured as the number of transformed cells per total number of cells. It can be represented as a percentage or as colony forming units (CFUs) per microgram of DNA.

One of the most common ways to measure transformation efficiency is by performing a colony forming assay. Here is an example of how to calculate transformation efficiency using colony forming units (CFUs):

1. Plate a known number of cells on agar plates containing the appropriate antibiotics.
2. Incubate the plates for a period of time (usually overnight) at the appropriate temperature and conditions for the cells.
3. Count the number of colonies that grow on the plates. This represents the number of cells that have taken up and expressed the plasmid DNA.
4. To calculate the transformation efficiency, divide the number of colonies by the number of cells plated and multiply by 100. The result will be the transformation efficiency as a percentage.

For example, if you plate 1 × 10^{7} cells and count 1000 colonies, the transformation efficiency is: (1000/1 × 10^{7}) × 100 = 0.1%

Alternatively, CFUs can be reported per microgram of DNA used for the transformation. This can be calculated by multiplying the number of colonies by the volume of the culture plated and dividing by the amount of DNA used.

Quantitative PCR (qPCR) - This method utilizes the fact that the plasmid DNA will have a specific gene or sequence that is not present in the host cell genome, and therefore can be used as a target for qPCR. By quantifying the number of copies of this specific gene or sequence in the transformed cells, it is possible to determine the amount of plasmid DNA present in the cell, and thus the transformation efficiency.

Fluorescent assay - This method relies on the use of a plasmid that contains a fluorescent protein or reporter gene. The transformed cells are then analyzed by flow cytometry or fluorescence microscopy to determine the number of cells that express the fluorescent protein. The transformation efficiency is then calculated as the percentage of cells that express the fluorescent protein.

The number of viable cells in a preparation for a transformation reaction may range from 2 × 10^{8} to 10^{11}; most common methods of E. coli preparation yield around 10^{10} viable cells per reaction. The standard plasmids used for determination of transformation efficiency in Escherichia coli are pBR322 or other similarly sized or smaller vectors, such as the pUC series of vectors. Different vectors however may be used to determine their transformation efficiency. 10–100 pg of DNA may be used for transformation, more DNA may be necessary for low-efficiency transformation (generally saturation level is reached at over 10 ng).

After transformation, 1% and 10% of the cells are plated separately, the cells may be diluted in media as necessary for ease of plating. Further dilution may be used for high efficiency transformation.

A transformation efficiency of 1 × 10^{8} cfu/μg for a small plasmid like pUC19 is roughly equivalent to 1 in 2000 molecules of the plasmid used being introduced into cells. In E. coli, the theoretical limit of transformation efficiency for most commonly used plasmids would be over 1 × 10^{11} cfu/μg. In practice the best achievable result may be around 2–4 × 10^{10} cfu/μg for a small plasmid like pUC19, and considerably lower for large plasmids.

== Factors affecting transformation efficiency ==
Individual cells are capable of taking up many DNA molecules, but the presence of multiple plasmids does not significantly affect the occurrence of successful transformation events. A number of factors may affect the transformation efficiency:

Plasmid size – A study done in E. coli found that transformation efficiency declines linearly with increasing plasmid size, i.e. larger plasmids transform less well than smaller plasmids.

Forms of DNA – Supercoiled plasmid have a slightly better transformation efficiency than relaxed plasmids – relaxed plasmids are transformed at around 75% efficiency of supercoiled ones. Linear and single-stranded DNA however have much lower transformation efficiency. Single-stranded DNAs are transformed at 10^{4} lower efficiency than double-stranded ones.

Media composition – The composition of the media used in the transformation process can affect the efficiency. For example, certain media supplements can increase the natural competence of cells.

Genotype of cells – Cloning strains may contain mutations that improve the transformation efficiency of the cells. For example, E. coli K12 strains with the deoR mutation, originally found to confer an ability of cell to grow in minimum media using inosine as the sole carbon source, have 4-5 times the transformation efficiency of similar strains without. For linear DNA, which is poorly transformed in E. coli, the recBC or recD mutation can significantly improve the efficiency of its transformation.

Culture conditions – E. coli cells are more susceptible to be made competent when it is growing rapidly, cells are therefore normally harvested in the early log phase of cell growth when preparing competent cells. The optimal optical density for harvesting cells normally lies around 0.4, although it may vary with different cell strains. A higher value of 0.94-0.95 has also been found to produce good yield of competent cells, but this can be impractical when cell growth is rapid.

Presence of antibiotics – The presence of antibiotics can increase the efficiency of transformation by inhibiting the growth of non-transformed cells and selecting for transformed cells that are resistant to the antibiotic. For instance, the use of β-lactam antibiotics has been shown for glutamate-producing bacteria to increase its transformation efficiencies.

Plasmid origin of replication – The origin of replication of the plasmid used in the transformation process can affect the efficiency in several ways. The copy number of the plasmid in the cell, the activity of the origin of replication in the host cells, and the expression of the genes on the plasmid can all affect the efficiency. The plasmid with a high copy number origin of replication will generally have a higher transfection efficiency than one with a low copy number origin, using a plasmid with an origin of replication that is active in the host cell can lead to a higher transfection efficiency.

Transformation conditions – The method of preparation of competent cells, the length of time of heat shock, temperature of heat shock, incubation time after heat shock, growth medium used, pH and various additives, all can affect the transformation efficiency of the cells. The presence of contaminants as well as ligase in a ligation mixture can reduce the transformation efficiency in electroporation, and inactivation of ligase or chloroform extraction of DNA may be necessary for electroporation, alternatively only use a tenth of the ligation mixture to reduce the amount of contaminants. Normal preparation of competent cells can yield transformation efficiency ranging from 10^{6} to 10^{8} cfu/μg DNA. Protocols for chemical method however exist for making super competent cells that may yield a transformation efficiency of over 1 billion.

Damage to DNA – Exposure of DNA to UV radiation in standard preparative agarose gel electrophoresis procedure for as little as 45 seconds can damage the DNA, and this can significantly reduce the transformation efficiency. Adding cytidine or guanosine to the electrophoresis buffer at 1 mM concentration however may protect the DNA from damage. A higher-wavelength UV radiation (365 nm) which cause less damage to DNA should be used if it is necessary work for work on the DNA on a UV transilluminator for an extended period of time. This longer wavelength UV produces weaker fluorescence with the ethidium bromide intercalated into the DNA, therefore if it is necessary to capture images of the DNA bands, a shorter wavelength (302 or 312 nm) UV radiations may be used. Such exposure however should be limited to a very short time if the DNA is to be recovered later for ligation and transformation.

== Efficiency of transformation methods ==
The method used for introducing the DNA have a significant impact on the transformation efficiency.

=== Electroporation ===
Electroporation tends to be more efficient than chemical methods and can be applied to a wide range of species and to strains that were previously resistant and recalcitrant to transformation techniques.

Electroporation has been found to have an average yield typically between 10^{4} - 10^{8} CFU/ug . However, a transformation efficiencies as high as 0.5-5 × 10^{10} colony forming units (CFU) per microgram of DNA for E. coli. For samples that are hard to handle, like cDNA libraries, gDNA, and plasmids larger than 30 kb, it is suggested to use electrocompetent cells that have transformation efficiencies of over 1 × 10^{10} CFU/μg. This will ensure a high success rate in introducing the DNA and forming a large number of colonies. It is important to adjust and optimize the electroporation buffer (Increasing the concentration of the electroporation buffer can result in increased transformation efficiencies ) and the shape, strength, number, and number of pulses these electrical parameters play a key role in transformation efficiency.

=== Chemical transformation ===
Chemical transformation or heat shock can be performed in a simple laboratory setup, typically yielding transformation efficiencies that are adequate for cloning and subcloning applications, approximately 10^{6} CFU/μg. One of the early methods used was a combination of CaCl_{2} and MgCl_{2} to treat the cells. However, these methods resulted in transformation efficiencies, with a maximum of 10^{5} - 10^{6} colony forming units (CFU) per microgram of plasmid DNA. Later research found that certain cations, such as Mn^{2+}, Ca^{2+}, Ba^{2+}, Sr^{2+} and Mg^{2+} could have a positive effect on transformation efficiencies, with Mn^{2+} showing the greatest effect.

== Restriction barriers to an efficient transformation ==
Some bacterial cells have restriction-modification systems that can degrade exogenous plasmids that are foreign to the host cell. This can greatly reduce the efficiency of transformation. This is due to restriction systems in the recipient cells that target and destroy exogenous DNA. These systems recognize exogenous DNA based on differences in methylation patterns. To address this problem, strategies such as altering the methylation of the exogenous DNA using commercial methylases or reducing the restriction activity in the recipient cells have been applied. For example, using methylation-negative mutants or temporarily inactivating the restriction system with heat can reduce the recipient cell's ability to impose restrictions on the exogenous DNA.

== See also ==
- Transformation (genetics)
