= MeT-5a =

Cell line

MeT-5a (Mesothelial cells transfected with pRSV-T 5A) is an epithelial cell line from the human pleural mesothelium that was isolated from the pleural fluids of non-cancerous adult male individual and subsequently transfected with a PBR322 based plasmid containing the coding region for SV40 in order to immortalise them.

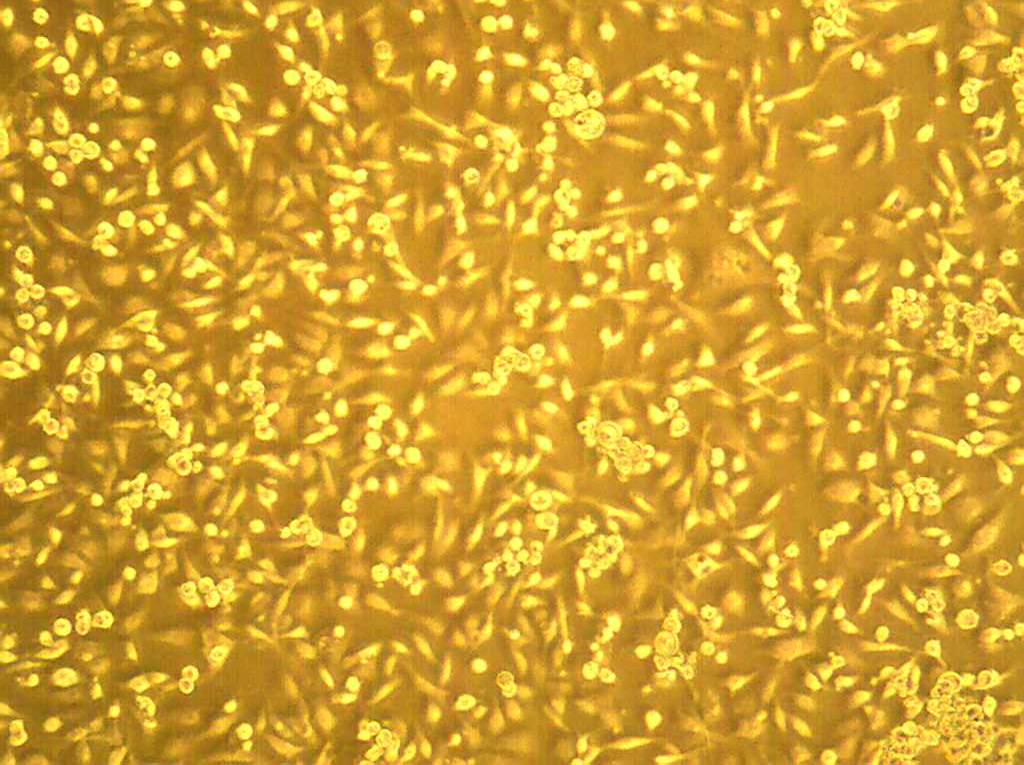
MeT-5a cell line, image taken at 200x magnification

MeT-5a are used as a laboratory model for the study of the function and pathology of the pleural mesothelium and is often used as a control cell line in research into conditions such as mesothelioma. MeT-5a are used due to their relatively cheap cost compared to primary models of the pleural mesothelium, as well as their hardiness, and their ability to indefinitely proliferate in a laboratory setting. MeT-5a cells were first isolated, immortalised, and cultured in the 1980s.
