= Marker gene =

Gene to check if nucleic acid sequence successfully inserted into an organism's DNA

In biology, a marker gene may have several meanings. In nuclear biology and molecular biology, a marker gene is a gene used to determine if a nucleic acid sequence has been successfully inserted into an organism's DNA. In particular, there are two sub-types of these marker genes: a selectable marker and a marker for screening. In metagenomics and phylogenetics, a marker gene is an orthologous gene group which can be used to delineate between taxonomic lineages.

== Selectable marker ==
A selectable marker protects the organism from a selective agent that would normally kill it or prevent its growth. In a transformation reaction, depending on the transformation efficiency, only one in several million to billion cells may take up DNA. Rather than checking every single cell, scientists use a selective agent to kill all cells that do not contain the foreign DNA, leaving only the desired ones.

Antibiotics are the most common selective agents. In bacteria, antibiotics are used almost exclusively. In plants, antibiotics that kill the chloroplast are often used as well, although tolerance to salts and growth-inhibiting hormones is becoming more popular. In mammals, resistance to antibiotics that would kill the mitochondria is used as a selectable marker.

== Screenable marker ==
A screenable marker will make cells containing the gene look different. There are three types of screening commonly used:

- Green fluorescent protein makes cells glow green under UV light. A specialized microscope is required to see individual cells. Yellow and red versions are also available, so scientists can look at multiple genes at once. It is commonly used to measure gene expression.
- GUS assay (using β-glucuronidase) is an excellent method for detecting a single cell by staining it blue without using any complicated equipment. The drawback is that the cells are killed in the process. It is particularly common in plant science.
- Blue white screen is used in both bacteria and eukaryotic cells. The bacterial lacZ gene encodes a beta-galactosidase enzyme. When media containing certain galactosides (e.g. X-gal), cells expressing the enzyme convert the X-gal to a blue product and can be seen with the naked eye. The strategy is therefore to integrate the DNA insert within the lacZ gene and to select the white colored colonies given they will have correctly integrated the insert. Blue colonies on the other hand will be able to convert the X-gal and give rise to the blue precipitate because the DNA insert either didn't integrate at all, or not at the correct location within the plasmid.

== See also ==
- Genetic marker
- Reporter gene
- Biomarker
- Recombinant DNA
