= Blue–white screen =

DNA screening technique

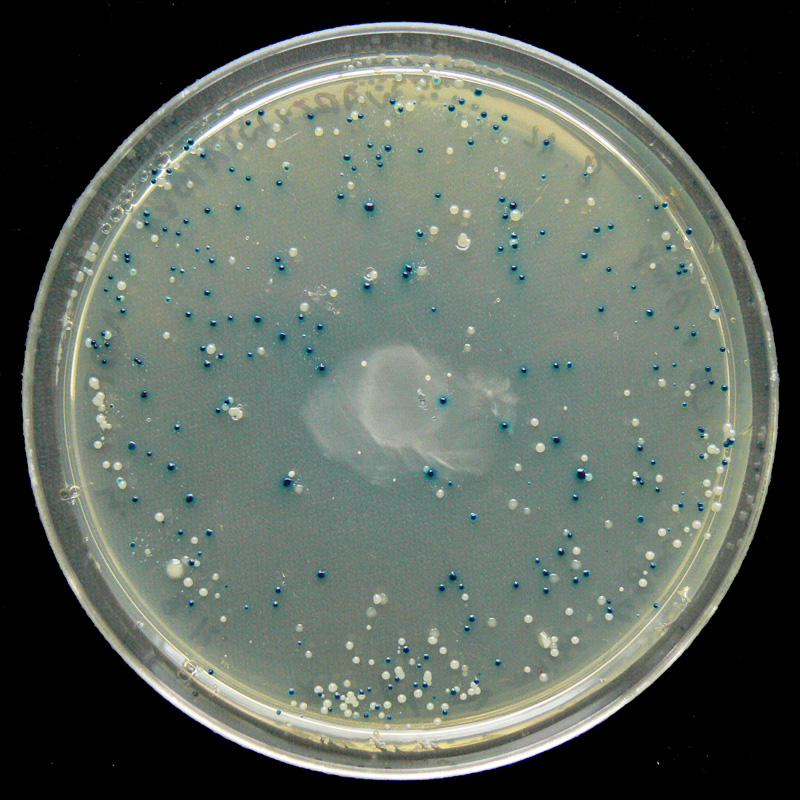
An LB agar plate showing the result of a blue–white screen.

The blue–white screen is a screening technique that allows for the rapid and convenient detection of recombinant bacteria in vector-based molecular cloning experiments. This method of screening is usually performed using a suitable bacterial strain, but other organisms such as yeast may also be used. DNA of transformation is ligated into a vector. The vector is then inserted into a competent host cell viable for transformation, which are then grown in the presence of X-gal. Cells transformed with vectors containing recombinant DNA will produce white colonies; cells transformed with non-recombinant plasmids (i.e. only the vector) grow into blue colonies.

== Background ==
Molecular cloning is one of the most commonly used procedures in molecular biology. A gene of interest may be inserted into a plasmid vector via ligation, and the plasmid is then transformed into Escherichia coli cells. However, not all the plasmids transformed into cells may contain the desired gene insert, and checking each individual colony for the presence of the insert is time-consuming. Therefore, a method for the detection of the insert would be useful for making this procedure less time- and labor-intensive. One of the early methods developed for the detection of insert is blue–white screening which allows for identification of successful products of cloning reactions through the colour of the bacterial colony.

The method is based on the principle of α-complementation of the β-galactosidase gene. This phenomenon of α-complementation was first demonstrated in work done by Agnes Ullmann in the laboratory of François Jacob and Jacques Monod, where the function of an inactive mutant β-galactosidase with deleted sequence was shown to be rescued by a fragment of β-galactosidase in which that same sequence, the α-donor peptide, is still intact. Langley et al. showed that the mutant non-functional β-galactosidase was lacking in part of its N-terminus with its residues 11—41 deleted, but it may be complemented by a peptide formed of residues 3—90 of β-galactosidase. M13 filamentous phage containing sequence coding for the first 145 amino acid was later constructed by Messing et al., and α-complementation via the use of a vector was demonstrated by the formation of blue plaques when cells containing the inactive protein were infected by the phage and then grown in plates containing X-gal.

The pUC series of plasmid cloning vectors by Vieira and Messing was developed from the M13 system and were the first plasmids constructed to take advantage of this screening method. In this method, DNA ligated into the plasmid disrupts the α peptide and therefore the complementation process, and no functional β-galactosidase can form. Cells transformed with plasmid containing an insert therefore form white colonies, while cells transformed with plasmid without an insert form blue colonies; result of a successful ligation can thus be easily identified by the white coloration of cells formed from the unsuccessful blue ones.

== Molecular mechanism ==
A schematic representation of the blue–white assay, used to screen for recombinant vectors

β-galactosidase is a protein encoded by the lacZ gene of the lac operon, and it exists as a homotetramer in its active state. However, a mutant β-galactosidase derived from the M15 strain of E. coli has its N-terminal residues 11—41 deleted and this mutant, the ω-peptide, is unable to form a tetramer and is inactive. This mutant form of protein however may return fully to its active tetrameric state in the presence of an N-terminal fragment of the protein, the α-peptide. The rescue of function of the mutant β-galactosidase by the α-peptide is called α-complementation.

In this method of screening, the host E. coli strain carries the lacZ deletion mutant (lacZΔM15) which contains the ω-peptide, while the plasmids used carry the lacZα sequence which encodes the first 59 residues of β-galactosidase, the α-peptide. Neither is functional by itself. However, when the two peptides are expressed together, as when a plasmid containing the lacZα sequence is transformed into a lacZΔM15 cells, they form a functional β-galactosidase enzyme.

The blue–white screening method works by disrupting this α-complementation process. The plasmid carries within the lacZα sequence an internal multiple cloning site (MCS). This MCS within the lacZα sequence can be cut by restriction enzymes so that the foreign DNA may be inserted within the lacZα gene, thereby disrupting the gene that produces α-peptide. Consequently, in cells containing the plasmid with an insert, no functional β-galactosidase may be formed.

The presence of an active β-galactosidase can be detected by X-gal, a colourless analog of lactose that may be cleaved by β-galactosidase to form 5-bromo-4-chloro-indoxyl, which then spontaneously dimerizes and oxidizes to form a bright blue insoluble pigment 5,5'-dibromo-4,4'-dichloro-indigo. This results in a characteristic blue colour in cells containing a functional β-galactosidase. Blue colonies therefore show that they may contain a vector with an uninterrupted lacZα (therefore no insert), while white colonies, where X-gal is not hydrolyzed, indicate the presence of an insert in lacZα which disrupts the formation of an active β-galactosidase.

The recombinant clones can be further analyzed by isolating and purifying small amounts of plasmid DNA from the transformed colonies and restriction enzymes can be used to cut the clone and determine if it has the fragment of interest. If the DNA is necessary to be sequenced, the plasmids from the colonies will need to be isolated at a point, whether to cut using restriction enzymes or performing other assays.

== Practical considerations ==
The correct type of vector and competent cells are important considerations when planning a blue–white screen. The plasmid must contain the lacZα, and examples of such plasmids are pUC19 and pBluescript. The E. coli cell should contain the mutant lacZ gene with deleted sequence (i.e. lacZΔM15), and some of the commonly used cells with such genotype are JM109, DH5α, and XL1-Blue. It should also be understood that the lac operon is affected by the presence of glucose. The protein EIIA^{Glc}, which is involved in glucose import, shuts down lactose permease when glucose is being transported into the cell. The media used in agar plate therefore should not include glucose.

X-gal is light-sensitive and therefore its solution and plates containing X-gal should be stored in the dark. Isopropyl β-D-1-thiogalactopyranoside (IPTG), which functions as the inducer of the lac operon, may be used in the media to enhance the expression of LacZ.

X-gal is an expensive material, thus other methods have been developed in order to screen bacteria. GFP has been developed as an alternative to help screen bacteria. The concept is similar to α-complementation in which a DNA insert can disrupt the coding sequence within a vector and thus disrupt the GFP production resulting in non-fluorescing bacteria. Bacteria that have recombinant vectors (vector + insert), will be white and not express the GFP protein, while non-recombinant (vector), will and fluoresce under UV light. GFP in general has been used as a reporter gene where individuals can definitively determine if a clone carries a gene that researchers are analyzing. On occasion, the medium in which the colonies grow can influence the screen and introduce false-positive results. X-gal on the medium can occasionally degrade to produce a blue color or GFP can lose its fluorescence because of the medium and can impact researchers capabilities to determine colonies with the desire recombinant and those that do not possess it.

=== Drawbacks ===
Some white colonies may not contain the desired recombinant plasmid for a number of reasons. The ligated DNA may not be the correct one or not properly ligated, and it is possible for some linearized vector to be transformed, its ends "repaired" and ligated together such that no LacZα is produced and no blue colonies may be formed. Mutation can also lead to the α-fragment not being expressed. A colony with no vector at all will also appear white, and may sometimes appear as satellite colonies after the antibiotic used has been depleted. It is also possible that blue colonies may contain the insert. This occurs when the insert is "in frame" with the LacZα gene and a STOP codon is absent in the insert. This can lead to the expression of a fusion protein that has a functional LacZα if its structure is not disrupted. The correct recombinant construct can sometimes give lighter blue colonies which may complicate its identification.

== See also ==
- Complementation test
- pBLU
- pGreen
- pUC19
- Recombinant DNA
