= Golden Gate Cloning =

Molecular cloning method for DNA assembly

Golden Gate assembly involves digesting DNA sequences containing a type IIS restriction enzyme cut site and ligating them together.

Golden Gate Cloning or Golden Gate assembly is a molecular cloning method that allows a researcher to simultaneously and directionally assemble multiple DNA fragments into a single piece using Type IIS restriction enzymes and T4 DNA ligase. This assembly is performed in vitro. Most commonly used Type IIS enzymes include BsaI, BsmBI, and BbsI.

Unlike standard Type II restriction enzymes like EcoRI and BamHI, these enzymes cut DNA outside of their recognition sites and, therefore, can create non-palindromic overhangs. Since 256 potential overhang sequences are possible, multiple fragments of DNA can be assembled by using combinations of overhang sequences. In practice, this means that Golden Gate Cloning is typically scarless. Additionally, because the final product does not have a Type IIS restriction enzyme recognition site, the correctly-ligated product cannot be cut again by the restriction enzyme, meaning the reaction is essentially irreversible. This has multiple benefits, the first is that it is possible to do digestion and ligation of the DNA fragments in a single reaction, in contrast to conventional cloning methods where these reactions are separate. The second is higher efficiency because the end product cannot be cut again by the restriction enzyme.

A typical thermal cycler protocol oscillates between 37 °C (optimal for restriction enzymes) and 16 °C (optimal for ligases) many times. While this technique can be used for a single insert, researchers have used Golden Gate Cloning to assemble many pieces of DNA simultaneously.

== Seamless cloning ==
Scar sequences are common in multiple segment DNA assembly. In the multisegment assembly method Gateway, segments are added into the donor with additional ATT sequences, which overlap in those added segments, and this results in the segments separated by the ATT sequences. In BioBrick assembly, an eight-nucleotide scar sequence, which codes for a tyrosine and a stop codon, is left between every segment added into the plasmid.

Golden Gate assembly uses Type IIS restriction enzymes cutting outside their recognition sequences. Also, the same Type IIS restriction enzyme can generate copious different overhangs on the inserts and the vector; for instance, BsaI creates 256 four-basepair overhangs. If the overhangs are carefully designed, the segments are ligated without scar sequences between them, and the final construct can be quasi-scarless, where the restriction enzyme sites remain on both sides of the insert. As additional segments can be inserted into the vectors without scars within an open reading frame, Golden Gate is widely used in protein engineering.

== Plasmid design ==
Although Golden Gate Cloning speeds up multisegment cloning, careful design of donor and recipient plasmids is required. Scientists at New England Biolabs have successfully demonstrated the assembly of 35 fragments via a single-tube Golden Gate Assembly reaction. Critical to this method of assembly, the vector backbone of the destination plasmid and all the assembly fragments are flanked by Type IIS restriction enzyme recognition sites, as this subtype of restriction enzymes cut downstream from their recognition sites. After cutting, each assembly active piece of DNA has unique overhangs that anneal to the next fragment of DNA in the planned assembly and become ligated, building the assembly. While it is also possible for an overhang to anneal back to its original complementary overhang associated with the upstream recognition site and become ligated, re-forming the original sequence, this will be susceptible to further cutting throughout the assembly reaction.

== Cloning standards ==
Restriction enzyme DNA assembly has cloning standards to minimize the change in cloning efficiency and the function of the plasmid, which can be caused by compatibility of the restriction sites on the insert and those on the vector.

Golden Gate assembly's cloning standards have two tiers. First-tier Golden Gate assembly constructs the single-gene construct by adding in genetic elements such as promoter, open reading frames, and terminators. Then, second-tier Golden Gate assembly combine several constructs made in first-tier assembly to make a multigene construct. To achieve second-tier assembly, modular cloning (MoClo) system and GoldenBraid2.0 standard are used.

=== MoClo system ===
Schematic workflow for generating complex combinatorial DNA libraries

Modular Cloning, or MoClo, is an assembly method introduced in 2011 by Ernst Weber et al., whereby using Type IIS restriction sites, the user can ligate at least six DNA parts together into a backbone in a one-pot reaction. It is a method based on Golden Gate Assembly, where Type IIS restriction enzymes cleave outside of their recognition site to one side, allowing for removal of those restriction sites from the design. This helps eliminate excess base pairs, or scars, from forming between DNA Parts. However, in order to ligate together properly, MoClo utilizes a set of 4-base pair fusion sites, which remain between parts after ligation, forming 4-base pair scars between DNA parts in the final DNA sequence following ligation of two or more parts.

MoClo utilizes a parallel approach, where all constructs from tier-one(level 0 modules) have restriction sites for BpiI on both sides of the inserts. The vector(also known as "destination vector"), where genes will be added, has an outward-facing BsaI restriction site with a drop-out screening cassette. LacZ is a common screening cassette, where it is replaced by the multigene construct on the destination vector. Each tier-one construct and the vector have different overhangs on them yet complementary to the overhang of the next segment, and this determines the layout of the final multigene construct. Golden Gate Cloning usually starts with level 0 modules. However, if the level 0 module is too large, cloning will start from level -1 fragments, which have to be sequenced, to help cloning the large construct. If starting from level -1 fragments, the level 0 modules do not need to be sequenced again, whereas if starting from level 0 modules, the modules must be sequenced.

==== Level 0 modules ====
Level 0 modules are the base for MoClo system, where they contain genetic elements like a promoter, a 5' untranslated region (UTR), a coding sequence, and a terminator. For the purpose of Golden Gate Cloning, the internal sequences of level 0 modules should not contain type IIS restriction enzymes sites for BsaI, BpiI, and Esp3I while surrounded by two BsaI restriction sites in inverted orientation. Level 0 modules without type IIS restriction sites flanking can add the BsaI sites during the process of Golden Gate Cloning.

If the level 0 modules contains any unwanted restriction site, they can be mutated in silico by removing one nucleotide from the Type IIS restriction site. In this process, one needs to make sure that the introduced mutation will not affect the genetic function encoded by the sequence of interest. A silent mutation in the coding sequence is preferred, for it neither changes the protein sequence nor the function of the gene of interest.

===== Level -1 fragments =====
Level -1 fragments are used to help cloning large level 0 modules. To clone level -1 fragments, blunt-end cloning with restriction ligation can be used. The vector used in cloning level -1 fragments cannot contain Type IIS restriction site BpiI that is used for the following assembly step. Moreover, the vector should also have a different selection marker from the destination vector in next assembly step, for example, if spectinomycin resistance is used in level 0 modules, level -1 fragments should have another antibiotic resistance like ampicillin.

==== Level 1 constructs ====
The level 1 destination vector determines the position and orientation of each gene in the final construct. There are fourteen available level 1 vectors, which differ only by the sequence of the flanking fusion sites while being identical in the internal fusion sites. Hence, all vectors can assemble the same level 0 parts.

As all level 1 vectors are binary plasmids, they are used for Agrobacterium mediated temporary expression in plants.

==== Level 2 constructs ====
Level 2 vectors have two inverted BpiI sites from the insertion of level 1 modules. The upstream fusion site is compatible to a gene cloned in level 1 vector while the downstream fusion site has a universal sequence. Each cloning allows 2-6 genes to be inserted in the same vector.

Adding more genes in one cloning step is not recommended, for this would result in incorrect constructs. On one hand, this can induce more restriction sites in the construct, where this open construct allows additional genes be added. On the other hand, this can also eliminate restriction sites, where this close construct stop the further addition of genes.

Therefore, constructs of more than six genes need successive cloning steps, which requires end-linkers containing BsaI or BsmBI internal restriction sites and blue or purple markers. Each cloning step needs to alternate the restriction site and the marker. Furthermore, two restriction enzymes are needed, where BpiI is used for releasing level 1 modules from level 1 constructs and BsaI/BsmBI is for digesting and opening the recipient level 2-n plasmid. When screening, the correct colonies should alternate from blue to purple every cloning step, but if a "closed" end-linker is used, the colonies will be white.

==== Level M constructs ====
Level M vectors are similar to level 2 vectors, but have a BsaI site located upstream of the two inverted BpiI sites. When one or several genes are cloned in a level M vector, a second BsaI is added at the end of the construct via a Level M end-linker (ref). This allows a fragment containing all assembled genes to be excised from the vector and subcloned in a next level of cloning (Level P).

==== Level P constructs ====
Level P vectors are similar to level M constructs except that the BpiI sites are replaced by BsaI sites and the BsaI sites are replaced by BpiI sites. Several level M constructs with compatible fusion sites can be subcloned into a level P vector in one step. Theoretically, as many as 36 genes can be assembled in one construct using 6 parallel level M reactions (each required for assembly of 6 genes per level M construct) followed by one final level P reaction. In practice, fewer genes are usually assembled as most cloning projects do not require so many genes. The structure of level M and P vectors is designed in a such as way that genes cloned in level P constructs can be further assembled in level M vectors. Repeated cloning in level M and P vectors forms a loop that can be repeated indefinitely to assemble progressively large constructs.

=== GoldenBraid ===
In standard Golden Gate Cloning, the restriction sites from the previous tier construct cannot be reused. To add more genes to the construct, restriction sites of a different Type IIS restriction enzyme need to be added to the destination vector. This can be done using either level 2, or M and P. A variant version of level M and P is also provided by GoldenBraid.

GoldenBraid overcomes the problem of designing numerous destination vectors by having a double loop, which is the "braid," to allow binary assembly of multiple constructs. There are two levels of destination plasmids, level α and level Ω. Each level of plasmids can be used as entry plasmids for the other level of plasmids for multiple times because both levels of plasmids have different Type IIS restriction sites that are in inverted orientation. For counterselection, the two levels of plasmids differ in their antibiotic resistance markers.

=== Golden mutagenesis ===
The Golden Gate Cloning principle can also be applied to perform mutagenesis termed Golden Mutagenesis. The technology is easy to implement as a web tool is available for primer design (https://msbi.ipb-halle.de/GoldenMutagenesisWeb/) and the vectors are deposited at Addgene (http://www.addgene.org/browse/article/28196591/).

== Name ==
The name Golden Gate Assembly comes from a proposal of Yuri Gleba. It shall refer on the one hand to the Gateway Technology, on the other hand picture the higher precision with a bridge connecting the streets of two shores seamlessly. One of the most well known bridges is the Golden Gate Bridge in San Francisco.

== See also ==
- Gibson assembly, another way to assemble multiple DNA fragments that does not use restriction enzymes
