= PBLU =

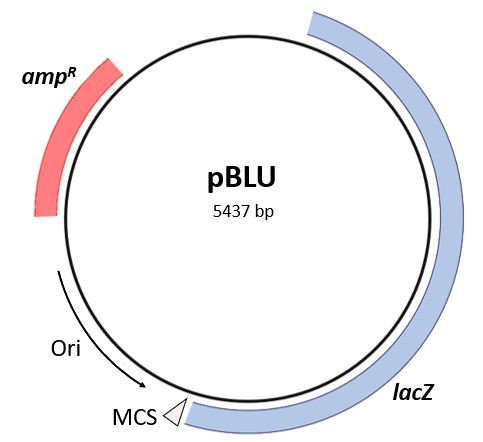
A map of pBLU

pBLU is a commercially produced bacterial plasmid that contains genes for ampicillin resistance (beta lactamase and beta galactosidase). It is often used in conjunction with an ampicillin-susceptible E. coli strain to teach students about transformation of eubacteria. It is 5,437 base pairs long. There is a multiple cloning site in the lacZ gene.
