= PBR322 =

Artificial plasmid

A schematic representation of the pBR322 vector with restriction sites indicated in blue.

pBR322 is a plasmid and was one of the first widely used cloning vectors for E. coli. Created in 1977 in the laboratory of Herbert Boyer at the University of California, San Francisco, it was named after Francisco Bolívar Zapata, a postdoctoral researcher, and Raymond L. Rodriguez. The p stands for "plasmid," and BR for "Bolivar" and "Rodriguez."

pBR322 is 4361 base pairs in length and has two antibiotic resistance genes: blaTEM-1, which confers ampicillin resistance, and tetA, which confers tetracycline resistance. It contains the origin of replication of pMB1, and the rop gene, which encodes a restrictor of plasmid copy number. The plasmid has unique restriction sites for more than forty restriction enzymes. Eleven of these forty sites lie within the tetA gene. There are two restriction sites, HindIII and ClaI, within the promoter of the tetA gene. There are six key restriction sites inside the blaTEM-1 gene. The antibiotic resistance genes are from pSC101 for tetracycline and RSF2124 for ampicillin. The restriction sites in the antibiotic resistance genes allow for insertional inactivation.

== Background ==
pBR322 was the most widely used early cloning vector. It has two antibiotic resistance genes as selectable markers, and over 40 unique restriction sites that made it suitable as a cloning vector. The plasmid was constructed with genetic material from three main sources: the tetracycline resistance gene of pSC101, the ampicillin resistance gene of RSF2124, and the replication elements of pMB1, a ColE1-like plasmid.

A large number of other plasmids based on pBR322 have been constructed specifically designed for a wide variety of purposes. Examples include the pUC series of plasmids. Most expression vectors for extrachromosomal protein expression and shuttle vectors contain the pBR322 origin of replication, and fragments of pBR322 are very popular in the construction of intraspecies shuttle or binary vectors and vectors for targeted integration and excision of DNA from chromosome.

Reference samples of this plasmid are maintained by public biological resource centers, such as BCCM/GeneCorner.

== DNA sequence ==
The sequence in pBR322 is

pBR322

       1 ttctcatgtt tgacagctta tcatcgataa gctttaatgc ggtagtttat cacagttaaa
      61 ttgctaacgc agtcaggcac cgtgtatgaa atctaacaat gcgctcatcg tcatcctcgg
     121 caccgtcacc ctggatgctg taggcatagg cttggttatg ccggtactgc cgggcctctt
     181 gcgggatatc gtccattccg acagcatcgc cagtcactat ggcgtgctgc tagcgctata
     241 tgcgttgatg caatttctat gcgcacccgt tctcggagca ctgtccgacc gctttggccg
     301 ccgcccagtc ctgctcgctt cgctacttgg agccactatc gactacgcga tcatggcgac
     361 cacacccgtc ctgtggatcc tctacgccgg acgcatcgtg gccggcatca ccggcgccac
     421 aggtgcggtt gctggcgcct atatcgccga catcaccgat ggggaagatc gggctcgcca
     481 cttcgggctc atgagcgctt gtttcggcgt gggtatggtg gcaggccccg tggccggggg
     541 actgttgggc gccatctcct tgcatgcacc attccttgcg gcggcggtgc tcaacggcct
     601 caacctacta ctgggctgct tcctaatgca ggagtcgcat aagggagagc gtcgaccgat
     661 gcccttgaga gccttcaacc cagtcagctc cttccggtgg gcgcggggca tgactatcgt
     721 cgccgcactt atgactgtct tctttatcat gcaactcgta ggacaggtgc cggcagcgct
     781 ctgggtcatt ttcggcgagg accgctttcg ctggagcgcg acgatgatcg gcctgtcgct
     841 tgcggtattc ggaatcttgc acgccctcgc tcaagccttc gtcactggtc ccgccaccaa
     901 acgtttcggc gagaagcagg ccattatcgc cggcatggcg gccgacgcgc tgggctacgt
     961 cttgctggcg ttcgcgacgc gaggctggat ggccttcccc attatgattc ttctcgcttc
    1021 cggcggcatc gggatgcccg cgttgcaggc catgctgtcc aggcaggtag atgacgacca
    1081 tcagggacag cttcaaggat cgctcgcggc tcttaccagc ctaacttcga tcactggacc
    1141 gctgatcgtc acggcgattt atgccgcctc ggcgagcaca tggaacgggt tggcatggat
    1201 tgtaggcgcc gccctatacc ttgtctgcct ccccgcgttg cgtcgcggtg catggagccg
    1261 ggccacctcg acctgaatgg aagccggcgg cacctcgcta acggattcac cactccaaga
    1321 attggagcca atcaattctt gcggagaact gtgaatgcgc aaaccaaccc ttggcagaac
    1381 atatccatcg cgtccgccat ctccagcagc cgcacgcggc gcatctcggg cagcgttggg
    1441 tcctggccac gggtgcgcat gatcgtgctc ctgtcgttga ggacccggct aggctggcgg
    1501 ggttgcctta ctggttagca gaatgaatca ccgatacgcg agcgaacgtg aagcgactgc
    1561 tgctgcaaaa cgtctgcgac ctgagcaaca acatgaatgg tcttcggttt ccgtgtttcg
    1621 taaagtctgg aaacgcggaa gtcagcgccc tgcaccatta tgttccggat ctgcatcgca
    1681 ggatgctgct ggctaccctg tggaacacct acatctgtat taacgaagcg ctggcattga
    1741 ccctgagtga tttttctctg gtcccgccgc atccataccg ccagttgttt accctcacaa
    1801 cgttccagta accgggcatg ttcatcatca gtaacccgta tcgtgagcat cctctctcgt
    1861 ttcatcggta tcattacccc catgaacaga aatccccctt acacggaggc atcagtgacc
    1921 aaacaggaaa aaaccgccct taacatggcc cgctttatca gaagccagac attaacgctt
    1981 ctggagaaac tcaacgagct ggacgcggat gaacaggcag acatctgtga atcgcttcac
    2041 gaccacgctg atgagcttta ccgcagctgc ctcgcgcgtt tcggtgatga cggtgaaaac
    2101 ctctgacaca tgcagctccc ggagacggtc acagcttgtc tgtaagcgga tgccgggagc
    2161 agacaagccc gtcagggcgc gtcagcgggt gttggcgggt gtcggggcgc agccatgacc
    2221 cagtcacgta gcgatagcgg agtgtatact ggcttaacta tgcggcatca gagcagattg
    2281 tactgagagt gcaccatatg cggtgtgaaa taccgcacag atgcgtaagg agaaaatacc
    2341 gcatcaggcg ctcttccgct tcctcgctca ctgactcgct gcgctcggtc gttcggctgc
    2401 ggcgagcggt atcagctcac tcaaaggcgg taatacggtt atccacagaa tcaggggata
    2461 acgcaggaaa gaacatgtga gcaaaaggcc agcaaaaggc caggaaccgt aaaaaggccg
    2521 cgttgctggc gtttttccat aggctccgcc cccctgacga gcatcacaaa aatcgacgct
    2581 caagtcagag gtggcgaaac ccgacaggac tataaagata ccaggcgttt ccccctggaa
    2641 gctccctcgt gcgctctcct gttccgaccc tgccgcttac cggatacctg tccgcctttc
    2701 tcccttcggg aagcgtggcg ctttctcata gctcacgctg taggtatctc agttcggtgt
    2761 aggtcgttcg ctccaagctg ggctgtgtgc acgaaccccc cgttcagccc gaccgctgcg
    2821 ccttatccgg taactatcgt cttgagtcca acccggtaag acacgactta tcgccactgg
    2881 cagcagccac tggtaacagg attagcagag cgaggtatgt aggcggtgct acagagttct
    2941 tgaagtggtg gcctaactac ggctacacta gaaggacagt atttggtatc tgcgctctgc
    3001 tgaagccagt taccttcgga aaaagagttg gtagctcttg atccggcaaa caaaccaccg
    3061 ctggtagcgg tggttttttt gtttgcaagc agcagattac gcgcagaaaa aaaggatctc
    3121 aagaagatcc tttgatcttt tctacggggt ctgacgctca gtggaacgaa aactcacgtt
    3181 aagggatttt ggtcatgaga ttatcaaaaa ggatcttcac ctagatcctt ttaaattaaa
    3241 aatgaagttt taaatcaatc taaagtatat atgagtaaac ttggtctgac agttaccaat
    3301 gcttaatcag tgaggcacct atctcagcga tctgtctatt tcgttcatcc atagttgcct
    3361 gactccccgt cgtgtagata actacgatac gggagggctt accatctggc cccagtgctg
    3421 caatgatacc gcgagaccca cgctcaccgg ctccagattt atcagcaata aaccagccag
    3481 ccggaagggc cgagcgcaga agtggtcctg caactttatc cgcctccatc cagtctatta
    3541 attgttgccg ggaagctaga gtaagtagtt cgccagttaa tagtttgcgc aacgttgttg
    3601 ccattgctgc aggcatcgtg gtgtcacgct cgtcgtttgg tatggcttca ttcagctccg
    3661 gttcccaacg atcaaggcga gttacatgat cccccatgtt gtgcaaaaaa gcggttagct
    3721 ccttcggtcc tccgatcgtt gtcagaagta agttggccgc agtgttatca ctcatggtta
    3781 tggcagcact gcataattct cttactgtca tgccatccgt aagatgcttt tctgtgactg
    3841 gtgagtactc aaccaagtca ttctgagaat agtgtatgcg gcgaccgagt tgctcttgcc
    3901 cggcgtcaac acgggataat accgcgccac atagcagaac tttaaaagtg ctcatcattg
    3961 gaaaacgttc ttcggggcga aaactctcaa ggatcttacc gctgttgaga tccagttcga
    4021 tgtaacccac tcgtgcaccc aactgatctt cagcatcttt tactttcacc agcgtttctg
    4081 ggtgagcaaa aacaggaagg caaaatgccg caaaaaaggg aataagggcg acacggaaat
    4141 gttgaatact catactcttc ctttttcaat attattgaag catttatcag ggttattgtc
    4201 tcatgagcgg atacatattt gaatgtattt agaaaaataa acaaataggg gttccgcgca
    4261 catttccccg aaaagtgcca cctgacgtct aagaaaccat tattatcatg acattaacct
    4321 ataaaaatag gcgtatcacg aggccctttc gtcttcaaga a

== In popular culture ==
=== Books ===
In Michael Crichton's 1990 science fiction novel Jurassic Park “the actual structure of a small fragment of dinosaur DNA“ is shown to visitors to the Jurassic Park Research Institute. In 1992 NCBI Investigator Mark Boguski used BLAST to compare the Jurassic Park sequence with known DNA sequences, and discovered that the book sequence consisted of three sequences from pBR322, one repeated twice, separated by short random sequences. Boguski wrote up his work as a humorous paper, which was published in the journal BioTechniques.
