= PUC19 =

Plasmid cloning vector

Vector map of pUC19

pUC19 is one of a series of plasmid cloning vectors designed by Joachim Messing and co-workers. The designation "pUC" is derived from the classical "p" prefix (denoting "plasmid") and the abbreviation for the University of California, where early work on the plasmid series had been conducted. The pUC plasmids are all circular double stranded DNA about 2700 base pairs in length. The pUC plasmids are some of the most widely used cloning vectors. This is in part because cells that have successfully been transformed can be easily distinguished from those that have not based on color differences of colonies. pUC18 is similar to pUC19, but the multiple cloning site (MCS) region is reversed.

== Features ==
A schematic representation of the molecular mechanism involved for screening recombinant cells

pUC19 encodes the α-peptide of β-galactosidase (lacZ) gene of E. coli. This allows for blue–white screening when used with host strains containing the lacZΔM15 (Note: also referred to as lacZDM15) mutation (e.g. E. coli JM109, DH5α and XL1-Blue strains). These strains produces only the C-terminal portion of lacZ, also known as the β-polypeptide. If pUC19 is inserted into one of these strains and grown the presence of IPTG, the bacteria will synthesise both fragments of the enzyme. Both the fragments can together hydrolyse X-gal (5-bromo-4-chloro-3-indolyl-beta-D-galactopyranoside) and form blue colonies when grown on media where it is supplemented. The multiple cloning site (MCS) of pUC19 is located within the lacZ gene. Insertion of DNA into the MCS causes insertional inactivation of the α-peptide gene, which prevents intra-allelic complementation. Thus, as cells containing recombinant plasmids will not produce a functional form of β-galactosidase, they will appear as white colonies which can be distinguished from non-recombinant cells, which are blue.

In addition to β-galactosidase, pUC19 also encodes for an ampicillin resistance gene (amp^{R}), via a β-lactamase enzyme that functions by degrading ampicillin and reducing its toxicity to the host. Cells which have been successfully transformed with pUC19 can be differentiated from cells which have not by growing them on media with ampicillin. Only the cells with the plasmid containing amp^{R} will survive.

The origin of replication (ori) is derived from the plasmid pMB1. pUC19 is a high copy number plasmid. The high copy number is a result of the lack of the rop gene and a single point mutation in the ori.

== Use in research ==
Due to its extensive use as a cloning vector in research and industry, pUC19 is frequently used in research as a model plasmid. For example, biophysical studies on its naturally supercoiled state have determined its radius of gyration to be 65.6 nm and its Stokes radius to be 43.6 nm.

Reference samples of this plasmid are maintained by public biological resource centers, such as BCCM/GeneCorner.

== See also ==
- Vector (molecular biology)
- Antibiotic resistance
- pBLU
