= Glucuronidase =

Glucuronidase may refer to several enzymes:

- Alpha-glucuronidase
- Beta-glucuronidase
- Glycyrrhizinate beta-glucuronidase
- Glucuronosyl-disulfoglucosamine glucuronidase
