= List of ISO standards 16000–17999 =

This is a list of published (Note: This list generally excludes draft versions.) International Organization for Standardization (ISO) standards and other deliverables. (Note: ISO deliverables include "specifications" (ISO/PAS, ISO/TS), "reports" (ISO/TR), etc, which are not referred to by ISO as "standards".) For a complete and up-to-date list of all the ISO standards, see the ISO catalogue.

The standards are protected by copyright and most of them must be purchased. However, about 300 of the standards produced by ISO and IEC's Joint Technical Committee 1 (JTC 1) have been made freely and publicly available.

== ISO 16000 – ISO 16999 ==
- ISO/TR 16015:2003 Geometrical product specifications (GPS) - Systematic errors and contributions to measurement uncertainty of length measurement due to thermal influences
- ISO 16016:2016 Technical product documentation – Protection notices for restricting the use of documents and products
- ISO 16020:2005 Steel for the reinforcement and prestressing of concrete – Vocabulary
- ISO/IEC 16022:2006 Information technology - Automatic identification and data capture techniques - Data Matrix bar code symbology specification
- ISO/IEC 16023:2000 Information technology - International symbology specification - MaxiCode
- ISO 16032:2004 Acoustics – Measurement of sound pressure level from service equipment in buildings – Engineering method
- ISO 16034:2002 Ophthalmic optics – Specifications for single-vision ready-to-wear near- vision spectacles
- ISO 16039:2004 Road construction and maintenance equipment – Slipform pavers – Definitions and commercial specifications
- ISO 16054:2000 Implants for surgery – Minimum data sets for surgical implants
- ISO/TR 16056 Health informatics - Interoperability of telehealth systems and networks
  - ISO/TR 16056-1:2004 Part 1: Introduction and definitions
  - ISO/TR 16056-2:2004 Part 2: Real-time systems
- ISO/TS 16058:2004 Health informatics – Interoperability of telelearning systems
- ISO 16059:2007 Dentistry - Required elements for codification used in data exchange
- ISO 16061:2015 Instrumentation for use in association with non-active surgical implants – General requirements
- ISO 16063 Methods for the calibration of vibration and shock transducers
  - ISO 16063-1:1998 Part 1: Basic concepts
  - ISO 16063-11:1999 Part 11: Primary vibration calibration by laser interferometry
  - ISO 16063-12:2002 Part 12: Primary vibration calibration by the reciprocity method
  - ISO 16063-13:2001 Part 13: Primary shock calibration using laser interferometry
  - ISO 16063-15:2006 Part 15: Primary angular vibration calibration by laser interferometry
  - ISO 16063-16:2014 Part 16: Calibration by Earth's gravitation
  - ISO 16063-17:2016 Part 17: Primary calibration by centrifuge
  - ISO 16063-21:2003 Part 21: Vibration calibration by comparison to a reference transducer
  - ISO 16063-22:2005 Part 22: Shock calibration by comparison to a reference transducer
  - ISO 16063-31:2009 Part 31: Testing of transverse vibration sensitivity
  - ISO 16063-32:2016 Part 32: Resonance testing – Testing the frequency and the phase response of accelerometers by means of shock excitation
  - ISO 16063-33:2017 Part 33: Testing of magnetic field sensitivity
  - ISO 16063-41:2011 Part 41: Calibration of laser vibrometers
  - ISO 16063-42:2014 Part 42: Calibration of seismometers with high accuracy using acceleration of gravity
  - ISO 16063-43:2015 Part 43: Calibration of accelerometers by model-based parameter identification
  - ISO 16063-45:2017 Part 45: In-situ calibration of transducers with built in calibration coil
- ISO 16069:2004 Graphical symbols - Safety signs - Safety way guidance systems (SWGS)
- ISO/IEC 16085:2006 Systems and software engineering - Life cycle processes - Risk management
- ISO 16087:2013 Implants for surgery – Roentgen stereophotogrammetric analysis for the assessment of migration of orthopaedic implants
- ISO 16103:2005 Packaging - Transport packaging for dangerous goods - Recycled plastics material
- ISO 16106:2006 Packaging - Transport packages for dangerous goods - Dangerous goods packagings, intermediate bulk containers (IBCs) and large packagings—Guidelines for the application of ISO 9001
- ISO 16134 Earthquake- and subsidence-resistant design of ductile iron pipelines
- ISO 16140 Microbiology of the food chain – Method validation
  - ISO 16140-1:2016 Part 1: Vocabulary
  - ISO 16140-2:2016 Part 2: Protocol for the validation of alternative (proprietary) methods against a reference method
- ISO 16142 Medical devices – Recognized essential principles of safety and performance of medical devices
  - ISO 16142-1:2016 Part 1: General essential principles and additional specific essential principles for all non-IVD medical devices and guidance on the selection of standards
  - ISO 16142-2:2017 Part 2: General essential principles and additional specific essential principles for all IVD medical devices and guidance on the selection of standards
- ISO/TR 16153:2004 Piston-operated volumetric instruments – Determination of uncertainty for volume measurements made using the photometric method
- ISO 16155:2006 Ships and marine technology – Computer applications – Shipboard loading instruments
- ISO 16165:2013 Ships and marine technology - Marine environment protection - Terminology relating to oil spill response
- ISO/IEC TR 16166:2010 Information technology – Telecommunications and information exchange between systems – Next Generation Corporate Networks (NGCN) – Security of session-based communications
- ISO/IEC TR 16167:2011 Information technology – Telecommunications and information exchange between systems – Next Generation Corporate Networks (NGCN) – Emergency calls
- ISO 16175 Information and documentation - Principles and functional requirements for records in electronic office environments
  - ISO 16175-1:2010 Part 1: Overview and statement of principles
  - ISO 16175-2:2011 Part 2: Guidelines and functional requirements for digital records management systems
  - ISO 16175-3:2010 Part 3: Guidelines and functional requirements for records in business systems
- ISO 16192:2017 Space systems - Experience gained in space projects (lessons learned) - Principles and guidelines
- ISO/TS 16195:2013 Nanotechnologies – Guidance for developing representative test materials consisting of nano-objects in dry powder form
- ISO/TR 16196:2016 Nanotechnologies – Compilation and description of sample preparation and dosing methods for engineered and manufactured nanomaterials
- ISO/TR 16197:2014 Nanotechnologies – Compilation and description of toxicological screening methods for manufactured nanomaterials
- ISO 16212:2017 Cosmetics – Microbiology – Enumeration of yeast and mould
- ISO/TR 16218:2013 Packaging and the environment - Processes for chemical recovery
- ISO 16232 Road vehicles – Cleanliness of components of fluid circuits
  - ISO 16232-1:2007 Part 1: Vocabulary
  - ISO 16232-2:2007 Part 2: Method of extraction of contaminants by agitation
  - ISO 16232-3:2007 Part 3: Method of extraction of contaminants by pressure rinsing
  - ISO 16232-4:2007 Part 4: Method of extraction of contaminants by ultrasonic techniques
  - ISO 16232-5:2007 Part 5: Method of extraction of contaminants on functional test bench
  - ISO 16232-6:2007 Part 6: Particle mass determination by gravimetric analysis
  - ISO 16232-7:2007 Part 7: Particle sizing and counting by microscopic analysis
  - ISO 16232-8:2007 Part 8: Particle nature determination by microscopic analysis
  - ISO 16232-9:2007 Part 10: Particle sizing and counting by automatic light extinction particle counter
  - ISO 16232-10:2007 Part 10: Expression of results
- ISO 16239:2013 Metric series wires for measuring screw threads
- ISO 16245:2009 Information and documentation - Boxes, file covers and other enclosures, made from cellulosic materials, for storage of paper and parchment documents
- ISO 16249:2013 Springs – Symbols
- ISO 16254:2016 Acoustics – Measurement of sound emitted by road vehicles of category M and N at standstill and low speed operation – Engineering method
- ISO/IEC 16262:2011 Information technology – Programming languages, their environments and system software interfaces – ECMAScript language specification
- ISO 16269 Statistical interpretation of data
  - ISO 16269-4:2010 Part 4: Detection and treatment of outliers
  - ISO 16269-6:2014 Part 6: Determination of statistical tolerance intervals
  - ISO 16269-7:2001 Part 7: Median - Estimation and confidence intervals
  - ISO 16269-8:2004 Part 8: Determination of prediction intervals
- ISO/TS 16277 Health informatics – Categorial structures of clinical findings in traditional medicine
  - ISO/TS 16277-1:2015 Part 1: Traditional Chinese, Japanese and Korean medicine
- ISO 16278:2016 Health informatics – Categorial structure for terminological systems of human anatomy
- ISO 16284:2006 Ophthalmic optics – Information interchange for ophthalmic optical equipment
- ISO/TR 16310:2014 Symbol libraries for construction and facilities management
- ISO/IEC 16317:2011 Information technology – Telecommunications and information exchange between systems – proxZzzy for sleeping hosts
- ISO/IEC/IEEE 16326:2009 Systems and software engineering - Life cycle processes - Project management
- ISO 16331 Optics and optical instruments – Laboratory procedures for testing surveying and construction instruments
  - ISO 16331-1:2017 Part 1: Performance of handheld laser distance meters
- ISO 16336:2014 Applications of statistical and related methods to new technology and product development process - Robust parameter design (RPD)
- ISO/IEC 16350:2015 Information technology - Systems and software engineering - Application management
- ISO/IEC 16353:2011 Information technology – Telecommunications and information exchange between systems – Front-end configuration command for NFC-WI (NFC-FEC)
- ISO 16355 Applications of statistical and related methods to new technology and product development process
  - ISO 16355-1:2015 Part 1: General principles and perspectives of Quality Function Deployment (QFD)
  - ISO 16355-2:2017 Part 2: Non-quantitative approaches for the acquisition of voice of customer and voice of stakeholder
  - ISO 16355-4:2017 Part 4: Analysis of non-quantitative and quantitative Voice of Customer and Voice of Stakeholder
  - ISO 16355-5:2017 Part 5: Solution strategy
  - ISO/TR 16355-8:2017 Part 8: Guidelines for commercialization and life cycle
- ISO/TR 16379:2014 Tissue-engineered medical products – Evaluation of anisotropic structure of articular cartilage using DT (Diffusion Tensor)-MR Imaging
- ISO/IEC 16382:2000 Information technology – Data interchange on 12,7 mm 208-track magnetic tape cartridges – DLT 6 format
- ISO/IEC 16388:2007 Information technology - Automatic identification and data capture techniques - Code 39 bar code symbology specification
- ISO/IEC 16390:2007 Information technology - Automatic identification and data capture techniques - Interleaved 2 of 5 bar code symbology specification
- ISO/TS 16401 Electronic fee collection – Evaluation of equipment for conformity to ISO/TS 17575-2
  - ISO/TS 16401-1:2012 Part 1: Test suite structure and test purposes
  - ISO/TS 16401-2:2012 Part 2: Abstract test suite
- ISO 16402:2008 Implants for surgery – Acrylic resin cement – Flexural fatigue testing of acrylic resin cements used in orthopaedics
- ISO/TS 16407 Electronic fee collection – Evaluation of equipment for conformity to ISO/TS 17575-1
  - ISO/TS 16407-1:2011 Part 1: Test suite structure and test purposes
  - ISO/TS 16407-2:2012 Part 2: Abstract test suite
- ISO/TS 16410 Electronic fee collection – Evaluation of equipment for conformity to ISO/TS 17575-3
  - ISO/TS 16410-1:2011 Part 1: Test suite structure and test purposes
  - ISO/TS 16410-2:2012 Part 2: Abstract test suite
- ISO 16413:2013 Evaluation of thickness, density and interface width of thin films by X-ray reflectometry – Instrumental requirements, alignment and positioning, data collection, data analysis and reporting
- ISO 16428:2005 Implants for surgery – Test solutions and environmental conditions for static and dynamic corrosion tests on implantable materials and medical devices
- ISO 16429:2004 Implants for surgery – Measurements of open-circuit potential to assess corrosion behaviour of metallic implantable materials and medical devices over extended time periods
- ISO 16437:2012 Ships and marine technology - Lifesaving and fire protection - Atmospheric oil mist detectors for ships
- ISO 16439:2014 Information and documentation - Methods and procedures for assessing the impact of libraries
- ISO 16443:2014 Dentistry - Vocabulary for dental implants systems and related procedure
- ISO/IEC 16448:2002 Information technology - 120 mm DVD - Read-only disk
- ISO/IEC 16449:2002 Information technology - 80 mm DVD - Read-only disk
- ISO 16457:2014 Space systems – Space environment (natural and artificial) – The Earth's ionosphere model: international reference ionosphere (IRI) model and extensions to the plasmasphere
- ISO/TS 16460:2016 Intelligent transport systems – Communications access for land mobiles (CALM) – Communication protocol messages for global usage
- ISO/IEC 16480:2015 Information technology - Automatic identification and data capture techniques - Reading and display of ORM by mobile devices
- ISO 16484 Building automation and control systems (BACS)
  - ISO 16484-1:2010 Part 1: Project specification and implementation
  - ISO 16484-2:2004 Part 2: Hardware
  - ISO 16484-3:2005 Part 3: Functions
  - ISO 16484-5:2017 Part 5: Data communication protocol
  - ISO 16484-6:2014 Part 6: Data communication conformance testing
- ISO/IEC 16485:2000 Information technology - Mixed Raster Content (MRC)
- ISO 16495:2013 Packaging - Transport packaging for dangerous goods - Test methods
- ISO/IEC 16500 Information technology – Generic digital audio-visual systems
  - ISO/IEC 16500-1:1999 Part 1: System reference models and scenarios
  - ISO/IEC 16500-2:1999 Part 2: System dynamics, scenarios and protocol requirements
  - ISO/IEC 16500-3:1999 Part 3: Contours: Technology domain
  - ISO/IEC 16500-4:1999 Part 4: Lower-layer protocols and physical interfaces
  - ISO/IEC 16500-5:1999 Part 5: High and mid-layer protocols
  - ISO/IEC 16500-6:1999 Part 6: Information representation
  - ISO/IEC 16500-7:1999 Part 7: Basic security tools
  - ISO/IEC 16500-8:1999 Part 8: Management architecture and protocols
  - ISO/IEC 16500-9:1999 Part 9: Usage information protocols
- ISO/IEC TR 16501:1999 Information technology - Generic digital audio-visual systems - Technical Report on ISO/IEC 16500 - Description of digital audio-visual functionalities
- ISO/IEC 16504:2011 Information technology – Telecommunications and information exchange between systems – MAC and PHY for operation in TV white space
- ISO/IEC 16509:1999 Information technology - Year 2000 terminology
- ISO/IEC 16512 Information technology – Relayed multicast protocol
  - ISO/IEC 16512-1:2016 Information technology – Relayed Multicast Control Protocol (RMCP) – Framework
  - ISO/IEC 16512-2:2016 Information technology – Relayed multicast protocol: Specification for simplex group applications
- ISO/IEC 16513:2005 Information technology – Group management protocol
- ISO/HL7 16527:2016 Health informatics – HL7 Personal Health Record System Functional Model, Release 1 (PHRS FM)
- ISO 16548:2012 Ships and marine technology - Ship design - General guidance on emergency towing procedures
- ISO 16549 Textiles – Unevenness of textile strands – Capacitance method
- ISO/TS 16550:2014 Nanotechnologies – Determination of silver nanoparticles potency by release of muramic acid from Staphylococcus aureus
- ISO 16559:2014 Solid biofuels – Terminology, definitions and descriptions
- ISO 16571:2014 Systems for evacuation of plume generated by medical devices
- ISO 16587:2004 Mechanical vibration and shock – Performance parameters for condition monitoring of structures
- ISO 16589 Rotary shaft lip-type seals incorporating thermoplastic sealing elements
  - ISO 16589-2:2011 Part 2: Vocabulary
- ISO 16609:2012 Financial services – Requirements for message authentication using symmetric techniques
- ISO 16610 Geometrical product specifications (GPS) – Filtration
- ISO 16612 Graphic technology - Variable printing data exchange
  - ISO 16612-1:2005 Part 1: Using PPML 2.1 and PDF 1.4 (PPML/VDX-2005)
  - ISO 16612-2:2010 Part 2: Using PDF/X-4 and PDF/X-5 (PDF/VT-1 and PDF/VT-2)
- ISO 16613 Graphic technology - Variable content replacement
  - ISO 16613-1:2017 Part 1: Using PDF/X for variable content replacement (PDF/VCR-1)
- ISO 16622:2002 Meteorology – Sonic anemometers/thermometers – Acceptance test methods for mean wind measurements
- ISO 16628:2008 Tracheobronchial tubes – Sizing and marking
- ISO 16638 Radiological protection - Monitoring and internal dosimetry for specific materials
  - ISO 16638-1:2015 Part 1: Inhalation of uranium compounds
- ISO 16641:2014 Measurement of radioactivity in the environment - Air - Radon 220: Integrated measurement methods for the determination of the average activity concentration using passive solid-state nuclear track detectors
- ISO 16642:2017 Computer applications in terminology — Terminological markup framework
- ISO 16649 Microbiology of the food chain – Horizontal method for the enumeration of beta-glucuronidase-positive Escherichia coli (Note: The exact wording of this title varies between parts. This is the wording of the most recently published part.)
  - ISO 16649-1:2001 Part 1: Colony-count technique at 44 degrees C using membranes and 5-bromo-4-chloro-3-indolyl beta-D-glucuronide
  - ISO 16649-2:2001 Part 2: Colony-count technique at 44 degrees C using 5-bromo-4-chloro-3-indolyl beta-D-glucuronide
  - ISO 16649-3:2015 Part 3: Detection and most probable number technique using 5-bromo-4-chloro-3-indolyl-ß-D-glucuronide
- ISO 16654:2001 Microbiology of food and animal feeding stuffs – Horizontal method for the detection of Escherichia coli O157
- ISO 16671:2015 Ophthalmic implants – Irrigating solutions for ophthalmic surgery
- ISO 16672:2015 Ophthalmic implants – Ocular endotamponades
- ISO 16682:2015 Aerospace series – Terminology for clamping devices
- ISO 16684 Graphic technology - Extensible metadata platform (XMP) specification
  - ISO 16684-1:2012 Part 1: Data model, serialization and core properties
  - ISO 16684-2:2014 Part 2: Description of XMP schemas using RELAX NG
- ISO/TR 16705:2016 Statistical methods for implementation of Six Sigma - Selected illustrations of contingency table analysis
- ISO 16706:2016 Ships and marine technology - Marine evacuation systems - Load calculations and testing
- ISO 16707:2016 Ships and marine technology - Marine evacuation systems - Determination of capacity
- ISO 16739:2013 Industry Foundation Classes (IFC) for data sharing in the construction and facility management industries
- ISO 16739-1:2018 Industry Foundation Classes (IFC) for data sharing in the construction and facility management industries — Part 1: Data schema
- ISO 16744:2003 Dentistry — Base metal materials for fixed dental restorations [Withdrawn: replaced with ISO 22674]
- ISO 16750 Road vehicles – Environmental conditions and testing for electrical and electronic equipment
- ISO 16760:2014 Graphic technology - Prepress data exchange - Preparation and visualization of RGB images to be used in RGB-based graphics arts workflows
- ISO/TR 16764:2003 Lifts, escalators and passenger conveyors – Comparison of worldwide standards on electromagnetic interference/electromagnetic compatibility
- ISO/TS 16785:2014 Electronic Fee Collection (EFC) – Interface definition between DSRC-OBE and external in-vehicle devices
- ISO/TR 16786:2015 Intelligent transport systems – The use of simulation models for evaluation of traffic management systems – Input parameters and reporting template for simulation of traffic signal control systems
- ISO 16787:2016 Intelligent transport systems – Assisted Parking System (APS) – Performance requirements and test procedures
- ISO/TS 16791:2014 Health informatics – Requirements for international machine-readable coding of medicinal product package identifiers
- ISO 16792:2015 Technical product documentation - Digital product definition data practices
- ISO 16818:2008 Building environment design – Energy efficiency – Terminology
- ISO/IEC 16824:1999 Information technology - 120 mm DVD rewritable disk (DVD-RAM)
- ISO/IEC 16825:1999 Information technology - Case for 120 mm DVD-RAM disks
- ISO 16832:2006 Acoustics – Loudness scaling by means of categories
- ISO 16840 Wheelchair seating
  - ISO 16840-1:2006 Part 1: Vocabulary, reference axis convention and measures for body segments, posture and postural support surfaces
- ISO/TS 16843 Health informatics – Categorial structures for representation of acupuncture
  - ISO/TS 16843-1:2016 Part 1: Acupuncture points
  - ISO/TS 16843-2:2015 Part 2: Needling
- ISO 16894:2009 Wood-based panels – Oriented strand board (OSB) – Definitions, classification and specifications
- ISO 16902 Hydraulic fluid power – Test code for the determination of sound power levels of pumps using sound intensity techniques: Engineering method
  - ISO 16902-1:2003 Part 1: Pumps
- ISO 16919:2014 Space data and information transfer systems – Requirements for bodies providing audit and certification of candidate trustworthy digital repositories
- ISO/TS 16949 Quality management systems – Particular requirements for the application of ISO 9001:2008 for automotive production and relevant service part organizations [Withdrawn: replaced by IATF 16949:2016]
- ISO/TS 16951:2004 Road vehicles – Ergonomic aspects of transport information and control systems (TICS) – Procedures for determining priority of on-board messages presented to drivers
- ISO/TS 16955:2016 Prosthetics – Quantification of physical parameters of ankle foot devices and foot units
- ISO/IEC 16963:2017 Information technology - Digitally recorded media for information interchange and storage - Test method for the estimation of lifetime of optical disks for long-term data storage
- ISO/IEC 16969:1999 Information technology - Data interchange on 120 mm optical disk cartridges using +RW format - Capacity: 3,0 Gbytes and 6,0 Gbytes
- ISO 16971:2015 Ophthalmic instruments – Optical coherence tomograph for the posterior segment of the human eye
- ISO/TR 16982:2002 Ergonomics of human-system interaction – Usability methods supporting human-centred design

== ISO 17000 – ISO 17999 ==
- ISO/IEC 17000:2004 Conformity assessment - Vocabulary and general principles
- ISO/IEC 17007:2009 Conformity assessment – Guidance for drafting normative documents suitable for use for conformity assessment
- ISO/IEC 17011:2017 Conformity assessment – Requirements for accreditation bodies accrediting conformity assessment bodies
- ISO/IEC 17020:2012 Conformity assessment—Requirements for the operation of various types of bodies performing inspection
- ISO/IEC 17021:2011 Conformity assessment—Requirements for bodies providing audit and certification of management systems
  - ISO/IEC 17021-1:2015 Part 1: Requirements
  - ISO/IEC 17021-2:2016 Part 2: Competence requirements for auditing and certification of environmental management systems
  - ISO/IEC 17021-3:2017 Part 3: Competence requirements for auditing and certification of quality management systems
  - ISO/IEC TS 17021-4:2013 Part 4: Competence requirements for auditing and certification of event sustainability management systems
  - ISO/IEC TS 17021-5:2014 Part 5: Competence requirements for auditing and certification of asset management systems
  - ISO/IEC TS 17021-6:2014 Part 6: Competence requirements for auditing and certification of business continuity management systems
  - ISO/IEC TS 17021-7:2014 Part 7: Competence requirements for auditing and certification of road traffic safety management systems
  - ISO/IEC TS 17021-9:2016 Part 9: Competence requirements for auditing and certification of anti-bribery management systems
- ISO/IEC TS 17022:2012 Conformity assessment—Requirements and recommendations for content of a third-party audit report on management systems
- ISO/IEC TS 17023:2013 Conformity assessment—Guidelines for determining the duration of management system certification audits
- ISO/IEC 17024:2012 Conformity assessment – General requirements for bodies operating certification of persons
- ISO/IEC 17025:2017 General requirements for the competence of testing and calibration laboratories
- ISO/IEC TR 17026:2015 Conformity assessment – Example of a certification scheme for tangible products
- ISO/IEC TS 17027:2014 Conformity assessment – Vocabulary related to competence of persons used for certification of persons
- ISO/IEC TR 17028:2017 Conformity assessment – Guidelines and examples of a certification scheme for services
- ISO/IEC 17029:2019 Conformity assessment — General principles and requirements for validation and verification bodies
- ISO/IEC 17030:2003 Conformity assessment – General requirements for third-party marks of conformity
- ISO/IEC 17033:2019 Ethical claims and supporting information - Principles and requirements
- ISO 17034:2016 General requirements for the competence of reference material producers
- ISO/IEC 17040:2005 Conformity assessment – General requirements for peer assessment of conformity assessment bodies and accreditation bodies
- ISO/IEC 17043:2010 Conformity assessment – General requirements for proficiency testing
- ISO 17049:2013 Accessible design - Application of braille on signage, equipment and appliances
- ISO/IEC 17050:2004 Conformity assessment — Supplier's declaration of conformity
  - ISO/IEC 17050-1:2004 Part 1: General requirements (reviewed and confirmed in 2020)
  - ISO/IEC 17050-2:2004 Part 2: Supporting documentation (reviewed and confirmed in 2020)
- ISO/IEC 17065:2012 Conformity assessment—Requirements for bodies certifying products, processes and services
- ISO 17066:2007 Hydraulic tools - Vocabulary
- ISO/IEC 17067:2013 Conformity assessment – Fundamentals of product certification and guidelines for product certification schemes
- ISO/TR 17068:2012 Information and documentation - Trusted third party repository for digital records
- ISO 17075 Leather - Chemical determination of chromium(VI) content in leather
  - ISO 17075-1:2017 Part 1: Colorimetric method
  - ISO 17075-2:2017 Part 2: Chromatographic method
- ISO 17080:2005 Manually portable agricultural and forestry machines and powered lawn and garden equipment - Design principles for single-panel product safety labels
- ISO 17088:2012 Specifications for compostable plastics
- ISO 17089 Measurement of fluid flow in closed conduits – Ultrasonic meters for gas
  - ISO 17089-1:2010 Part 1: Meters for custody transfer and allocation measurement
  - ISO 17089-2:2012 Part 2: Meters for industrial applications
- ISO 17090 Health informatics – Public key infrastructure
  - ISO 17090-1:2013 Part 1: Overview of digital certificate services
  - ISO 17090-2:2015 Part 2: Certificate profile
  - ISO 17090-3:2008 Part 3: Policy management of certification authority
  - ISO 17090-4:2014 Part 4: Digital Signatures for healthcare documents
  - ISO 17090-5:2017 Part 5: Authentication using Healthcare PKI credentials
- ISO/TR 17098:2013 Packaging material recycling - Report on substances and materials which may impede recycling
- ISO 17100:2015 Translation services—Requirements for translation services
- ISO 17115:2007 Health informatics - Vocabulary of compositional terminological systems
- ISO/TS 17117:2002 Health informatics - Controlled health terminology - Structure and high-level indicators
- ISO 17117 Health informatics — Terminological resources
  - ISO 17117-1:2018 Part 1: Characteristics
- ISO/TR 17119:2005 Health informatics – Health informatics profiling framework
- ISO 17123 Optics and optical instruments – Field procedures for testing geodetic and surveying instruments
  - ISO 17123-1:2014 Part 1: Theory
  - ISO 17123-2:2001 Part 2: Levels
  - ISO 17123-3:2001 Part 3: Theodolites
  - ISO 17123-4:2012 Part 4: Electro-optical distance meters (EDM measurements to reflectors)
  - ISO 17123-5:2012 Part 5: Total stations
  - ISO 17123-6:2012 Part 6: Rotating lasers
  - ISO 17123-7:2005 Part 7: Optical plumbing instruments
  - ISO 17123-8:2015 Part 8: GNSS field measurement systems in real-time kinematic (RTK)
- ISO/TS 17137:2014 Cardiovascular implants and extracorporeal systems – Cardiovascular absorbable implants
- ISO 17166:1999 Erythema reference action spectrum and standard erythema dose
- ISO 17185 Intelligent transport systems – Public transport user information
  - ISO 17185-1:2014 Part 1: Standards framework for public information systems
  - ISO/TR 17185-2:2015 Part 2: Public transport data and interface standards catalogue and cross references
  - ISO/TR 17185-3:2015 Part 3: Use cases for journey planning systems and their interoperation
- ISO/TS 17187:2013 Intelligent transport systems – Electronic information exchange to facilitate the movement of freight and its intermodal transfer – Governance rules to sustain electronic information exchange methods
- ISO/TS 17200:2013 Nanotechnology – Nanoparticles in powder form – Characteristics and measurements
- ISO 17201 Acoustics – Noise from shooting ranges
  - ISO 17201-1:2005 Part 1: Determination of muzzle blast by measurement
  - ISO 17201-2:2006 Part 2: Estimation of muzzle blast and projectile sound by calculation
  - ISO 17201-3:2010 Part 3: Guidelines for sound propagation calculations
  - ISO 17201-4:2006 Part 4: Prediction of projectile sound
  - ISO 17201-5:2010 Part 5: Noise management
- ISO 17202 Textiles – Determination of twist in single spun yarns – Untwist/retwist method
- ISO/IEC 17203:2017 Information technology – Open Virtualization Format (OVF) specification
- ISO 17208 Underwater acoustics – Quantities and procedures for description and measurement of underwater sound from ships
  - ISO 17208-1:2016 Part 1: Requirements for precision measurements in deep water used for comparison purposes
- ISO 17218:2014 Sterile acupuncture needles for single use
- ISO/TS 17251:2016 Health informatics – Business requirements for a syntax to exchange structured dose information for medicinal products
- ISO 17258:2015 Statistical methods - Six Sigma - Basic criteria underlying benchmarking for Six Sigma in organisations
- ISO 17261:2012 Intelligent transport systems – Automatic vehicle and equipment identification – Intermodal goods transport architecture and terminology
- ISO 17262:2012 Intelligent transport systems – Automatic vehicle and equipment identification – Numbering and data structures
- ISO 17263:2012 Intelligent transport systems – Automatic vehicle and equipment identification – System parameters
- ISO 17264:2009 Intelligent transport systems – Automatic vehicle and equipment identification – Interfaces
- ISO 17267:2009 Intelligent transport systems – Navigation systems – Application programming interface (API)
- ISO/TR 17302:2015 Nanotechnologies – Framework for identifying vocabulary development for nanotechnology applications in human healthcare
- ISO/IEC 17309:2000 Information technology – Telecommunications and information exchange between systems – Private Integrated Services Network – Mapping functions for the employment of a circuit mode basic service and the supplementary service user-to-user signalling as a pair of on-demand inter-PINX connections
- ISO/IEC 17310:2000 Information technology – Telecommunications and information exchange between systems – Private Integrated Services Network – Mapping functions for the employment of 64 kbit/s circuit mode connections with 16 kbit/s sub-multiplexing
- ISO/IEC 17311:2000 Information technology – Telecommunications and information exchange between systems – Private Integrated Services Network – Mapping functions for the employment of 64 kbit/s circuit mode connections with 8 kbit/s sub-multiplexing
- ISO 17316:2015 Information and documentation - International standard link identifier (ISLI)
- ISO 17338:2009 Ships and marine technology - Drawings for fire protection - Indications of fire rating by divisions for ships and high-speed craft
- ISO/IEC 17341:2009 Information technology - Data interchange on 120 mm and 80 mm optical disk using +RW format - Capacity: 4,7 Gbytes and 1,46 Gbytes per side (recording speed up to 4X)
- ISO/IEC 17342:2004 Information technology - 80 mm (1,46 Gbytes per side) and 120 mm (4,70 Gbytes per side) DVD re-recordable disk (DVD-RW)
- ISO/IEC 17343:2007 Information technology – Telecommunications and information exchange between systems – Corporate telecommunication networks – Signalling interworking between QSIG and SIP – Basic services
- ISO/IEC 17344:2009 Information technology - Data interchange on 120 mm and 80 mm optical disk using +R format - Capacity: 4,7 Gbytes and 1,46 Gbytes per side (recording speed up to 16X)
- ISO/IEC 17345:2006 Information technology - Data Interchange on 130 mm Rewritable and Write Once Read Many Ultra Density Optical (UDO) Disk Cartridges - Capacity: 30 Gbytes per Cartridge - First Generation
- ISO/IEC 17346:2005 Information technology - Data interchange on 90 mm optical disk cartridges - Capacity: 1,3 Gbytes per cartridge
- ISO/TR 17350:2013 Direct Marking on Plastic Returnable Transport Items (RTIs)
- ISO 17351:2013 Packaging - Braille on packaging for medicinal products
- ISO 17359:2011 Condition monitoring and diagnostics of machines – General guidelines
- ISO 17361:2017 Intelligent transport systems – Lane departure warning systems – Performance requirements and test procedures
- ISO 17363:2013 Supply chain applications of RFID - Freight containers
- ISO 17364:2013 Supply chain applications of RFID - Returnable transport items (RTIs) and returnable packaging items (RPIs)
- ISO 17365:2013 Supply chain applications of RFID - Transport units
- ISO 17366:2013 Supply chain applications of RFID - Product packaging
- ISO 17367:2013 Supply chain applications of RFID - Product tagging
- ISO 17369:2013 Statistical data and metadata exchange (SDMX)
- ISO/TR 17370:2013 Application Guideline on Data Carriers for Supply Chain Management
- ISO/TR 17384:2008 Intelligent transport systems – Interactive centrally determined route guidance (CDRG) – Air interface message set, contents and format
- ISO 17387:2008 Intelligent transport systems – Lane change decision aid systems (LCDAS) – Performance requirements and test procedures
- ISO 17398:2004 Safety colours and safety signs - Classification, performance and durability of safety signs
- ISO 17409:2020 Electrically propelled road vehicles — Conductive power transfer — Safety requirements
- ISO 17410:2001 Microbiology of food and animal feeding stuffs – Horizontal method for the enumeration of psychrotrophic microorganisms
- ISO/IEC 17417:2011 Information technology – Telecommunications and information exchange between systems – Short Distance Visible Light Communication (SDVLC)
- ISO/TS 17419:2014 Intelligent transport systems – Cooperative systems – Classification and management of ITS applications in a global context
- ISO/TS 17423:2014 Intelligent transport systems – Cooperative systems – ITS application requirements and objectives for selection of communication profiles
- ISO/TR 17424:2015 Intelligent transport systems – Cooperative systems – State of the art of Local Dynamic Maps concepts
- ISO/TS 17425:2016 Intelligent transport systems – Cooperative systems – Data exchange specification for in-vehicle presentation of external road and traffic related data
- ISO/TS 17426:2016 Intelligent transport systems – Cooperative systems – Contextual speeds
- ISO 17427 Intelligent transport systems – Cooperative ITS
  - ISO/TS 17427:2014 Roles and responsibilities in the context of cooperative ITS based on architecture(s) for cooperative systems
  - ISO/TR 17427-2:2015 Part 2: Framework overview
  - ISO/TR 17427-3:2015 Part 3: Concept of operations (ConOps) for 'core' systems
  - ISO/TR 17427-4:2015 Part 4: Minimum system requirements and behaviour for core systems
  - ISO/TR 17427-6:2015 Part 6: 'Core system' risk assessment methodology
  - ISO/TR 17427-7:2015 Part 7: Privacy aspects
  - ISO/TR 17427-8:2015 Part 8: Liability aspects
  - ISO/TR 17427-9:2015 Part 9: Compliance and enforcement aspects
  - ISO/TR 17427-10:2015 Part 10: Driver distraction and information display
- ISO/TS 17429:2017 Intelligent transport systems – Cooperative ITS – ITS station facilities for the transfer of information between ITS stations
- ISO 17432:2004 Health informatics – Messages and communication – Web access to DICOM persistent objects
- ISO 17438 Intelligent transport systems – Indoor navigation for personal and vehicle ITS station
  - ISO 17438-1:2016 Part 1: General information and use case definition
- ISO/TS 17439:2014 Health informatics – Development of terms and definitions for health informatics glossaries
- ISO 17442:2012 Financial services - Legal Entity Identifier (LEI)
- ISO/TS 17444 Electronic fee collection – Charging performance
  - ISO/TS 17444-1:2017 Part 1: Metrics
  - ISO/TS 17444-2:2017 Part 2: Examination framework
- ISO 17450 Geometrical product specifications (GPS) - Basic concepts
  - ISO 17450-1:2011 Part 1: Model for geometrical specification and verification
  - ISO 17450-2:2012 Part 2: Basic tenets, specifications, operators, uncertainties and ambiguities
  - ISO 17450-3:2016 Part 3: Toleranced features
  - ISO 17450-4:2017 Part 4: Geometrical characteristics for quantifying GPS deviations
- ISO 17451 Packaging - Codification of contents for inventories for shipments of household goods and personal effects
  - ISO 17451-1:2016 Part 1: Numeric codification of inventories
  - ISO/TS 17451-2:2017 Part 2: XML messaging structure for electronic transmission of inventory data
- ISO/TR 17452:2007 Intelligent transport systems – Using UML for defining and documenting ITS/TICS interfaces
- ISO/IEC 17462:2000 Information technology – 3,81 mm wide magnetic tape cartridge for information interchange – Helical scan recording – DDS-4 format
- ISO/TR 17465 Intelligent transport systems - Cooperative ITS
  - ISO/TR 17465-1:2014 Part 1: Terms and definitions
  - ISO/TR 17465-2:2015 Part 2: Guidelines for standards documents
  - ISO/TR 17465-3:2015 Part 3: Release procedures for standards documents
- ISO/TS 17466:2015 Use of UV-Vis absorption spectroscopy in the characterization of cadmium chalcogenide colloidal quantum dots
- ISO 17468:2016 Microbiology of the food chain – Technical requirements and guidance on establishment or revision of a standardized reference method
- ISO 17469 Document management - Strategy markup language (StratML)
  - ISO 17469-1:2015 Part 1: StratML core elements
- ISO 17480:2015 Packaging - Accessible design - Ease of opening
- ISO 17488:2016 Road vehicles – Transport information and control systems – Detection-response task (DRT) for assessing attentional effects of cognitive load in driving
- ISO/TS 17503:2015 Statistical methods of uncertainty evaluation - Guidance on evaluation of uncertainty using two-factor crossed designs
- ISO/PAS 17506 Industrial automation systems and integration – COLLADA digital asset schema specification for 3D visualization of industrial data
- ISO 17510:2015 Medical devices – Sleep apnoea breathing therapy – Masks and application accessories
- ISO 17515 Intelligent transport systems – Communications access for land mobiles (CALM) – Evolved universal terrestrial radio access network (E-UTRAN)
  - ISO 17515-1:2015 Part 1: General usage
- ISO 17516:2014 Cosmetics – Microbiology – Microbiological limits
- ISO/TR 17522:2015 Health informatics – Provisions for health applications on mobile/smart devices
- ISO 17523:2016 Health informatics – Requirements for electronic prescriptions
- ISO 17526:2003 Optics and optical instruments – Lasers and laser-related equipment – Lifetime of lasers
- ISO 17532:2007 Stationary equipment for agriculture – Data communications network for livestock farming
- ISO 17534 Acoustics – Software for the calculation of sound outdoors
  - ISO 17534-1:2015 Part 1: Quality requirements and quality assurance
  - ISO/TR 17534-2:2014 Part 2: General recommendations for test cases and quality assurance interface
  - ISO/TR 17534-3:2015 Part 3: Recommendations for quality assured implementation of ISO 9613-2 in software according to ISO 17534-1
- ISO/IEC 17549 Information technology – User interface guidelines on menu navigation
  - ISO/IEC 17549-2:2015 Part 2: Navigation with 4-direction devices
- ISO/IEC 17568:2013 Information technology – Telecommunications and information exchange between systems – Close proximity electric induction wireless communications
- ISO 17572 Intelligent transport systems (ITS) – Location referencing for geographic databases
  - ISO 17572-1:2015 Part 1: General requirements and conceptual model
  - ISO 17572-2:2015 Part 2: Pre-coded location references (pre-coded profile)
  - ISO 17572-3:2015 Part 3: Dynamic location references (dynamic profile)
- ISO 17573:2010 Electronic fee collection – Systems architecture for vehicle-related tolling
- ISO/TS 17574:2017 Electronic fee collection – Guidelines for security protection profiles
- ISO 17575 Electronic fee collection – Application interface definition for autonomous systems
  - ISO 17575-1:2016 Part 1: Charging
  - ISO 17575-2:2016 Part 2: Communication and connection to the lower layers
  - ISO 17575-3:2016 Part 3: Context data
- ISO/TS 17582:2014 Quality management systems – Particular requirements for the application of ISO 9001:2008 for electoral organizations at all levels of government
- ISO/IEC 17592:2004 Information technology - 120 mm (4,7 Gbytes per side) and 80 mm (1,46 Gbytes per side) DVD rewritable disk (DVD-RAM)
- ISO/IEC 17594:2004 Information technology - Cases for 120 mm and 80 mm DVD-RAM disks
- ISO 17599:2015 Technical product documentation (TPD) – General requirements of digital mock-up for mechanical products
- ISO 17604:2015 Microbiology of the food chain – Carcass sampling for microbiological analysis
- ISO 17631:2002 Ships and marine technology - Shipboard plans for fire protection, life-saving appliances and means of escape
- ISO 17658:2002 Welding - Imperfections in oxyfuel flame cuts, laser beam cuts and plasma cuts - Terminology
- ISO 17659:2002 Welding - Multilingual terms for welded joints with illustrations
- ISO 17677 Resistance welding - Vocabulary
  - ISO 17677-1:2009 Part 1: Spot, projection and seam welding
- ISO 17679:2016 Tourism and related services – Wellness spa – Service requirements
- ISO 17680:2015 Tourism and related services – Thalassotherapy – Service requirements
- ISO 17687:2007 Transport Information and Control Systems (TICS) – General fleet management and commercial freight operations – Data dictionary and message sets for electronic identification and monitoring of hazardous materials/dangerous goods transportation
- ISO 17712:2103 Freight containers — Mechanical seals - updated the 2010 version: offers "a single source of information on mechanical seals which are acceptable for securing freight containers in international commerce". Supported by C-TPAT (the use of "H" class seals is required).
- ISO 17713 Meteorology – Wind measurements
  - ISO 17713-1:2007 Part 1: Wind tunnel test methods for rotating anemometer performance
- ISO 17714:2007 Meteorology – Air temperature measurements – Test methods for comparing the performance of thermometer shields/screens and defining important characteristics
- ISO 17717:2017 Meteorological balloons – Specification
- ISO 17724:2003 Graphical symbols - Vocabulary
- ISO/TS 17728:2015 Microbiology of the food chain – Sampling techniques for microbiological analysis of food and feed samples
- ISO 17740 Building construction machinery and equipment – Concrete placing systems for stationary equipment
  - ISO 17740-1:2015 Part 1: Terminology and commercial specifications
- ISO/IEC 17760 Information technology - AT Attachment
  - ISO/IEC 17760-101:2015 Part 101: ATA/ATAPI Command Set (ATA8-ACS)
  - ISO/IEC 17760-102:2016 Part 102: ATA/ATAPI Command set - 2 (ACS-2)
- ISO 17772 Energy performance of buildings - Indoor environmental quality
  - ISO 17772-1:2017 Part 1: Indoor environmental input parameters for the design and assessment of energy performance of buildings
- ISO 17776 Petroleum and natural gas industries – Offshore production installations – Guidelines on tools and techniques for hazard identification and risk assessment
- ISO/IEC 17788:2014 Information technology - Cloud computing - Overview and vocabulary
- ISO/IEC 17789:2014 Information technology - Cloud computing - Reference architecture
- ISO/TR 17791:2013 Health informatics – Guidance on standards for enabling safety in health software
- ISO 17799 Information technology - Security techniques - Code of Practice for Information Security Management (superseded by ISO/IEC 27002)
- ISO 17800 Building environment design – Facility Smart Grid Information Model
- ISO/IEC 17811 Information technology – Device control and management
  - ISO/IEC 17811-1:2014 Part 1: Architecture
  - ISO/IEC 17811-2:2015 Part 2: Specification of Device Control and Management Protocol
  - ISO/IEC 17811-3:2014 Part 3: Specification of Reliable Message Delivery Protocol
- ISO/IEC 17821:2015 Information technology – Specification of low power wireless mesh network over channel-hopped TDMA links
- ISO/TS 17822 In vitro diagnostic test systems - Qualitative nucleic acid-based in vitro examination procedures for detection and identification of microbial pathogens
  - ISO/TS 17822-1:2014 Part 1: General requirements, terms and definitions
- ISO/IEC 17825:2016 Information technology - Security techniques - Testing methods for the mitigation of non-invasive attack classes against cryptographic modules
- ISO/IEC 17826:2016 Information technology - Cloud Data Management Interface (CDMI)
- ISO/IEC 17839 Information technology – Identification cards – Biometric System-on-Card
  - ISO/IEC 17839-1:2014 Part 1: Core requirements
  - ISO/IEC 17839-2:2015 Part 2: Physical characteristics
  - ISO/IEC 17839-3:2016 Part 3: Logical information interchange mechanism
- ISO 17853:2011 Wear of implant materials – Polymer and metal wear particles – Isolation and characterization
- ISO/TS 17863:2013 Geometrical product specification (GPS) - Tolerancing of moveable assemblies
- ISO/TS 17865:2016 Geometrical product specifications (GPS) - Guidelines for the evaluation of coordinate measuring machine (CMM) test uncertainty for CMMs using single and multiple stylus contacting probing systems
- ISO/IEC 17875:2000 Information technology – Telecommunications and information exchange between systems – Private Integrated Services Network – Specification, functional model and information flows – Private User Mobility (PUM) – Registration supplementary service
- ISO/IEC 17876:2003 Information technology – Telecommunications and information exchange between systems – Private Integrated Services Network – Inter-exchange signalling protocol—Private User Mobility (PUM) – Registration supplementary service
- ISO/IEC 17877:2000 Information technology – Telecommunications and information exchange between systems – Private Integrated Services Network – Specification, functional model and information flows – Private User Mobility (PUM) – Call handling additional network features
- ISO/IEC 17878:2003 Information technology – Telecommunications and information exchange between systems – Private Integrated Services Network – Inter-exchange signalling protocol – Private User Mobility (PUM) – Call handling additional network features
- ISO 17893:2004 Steel wire ropes - Vocabulary, designation and classification
- ISO 17894:2005 Ships and marine technology – Computer applications – General principles for the development and use of programmable electronic systems in marine applications
- ISO 17901 Optics and photonics – Holography
  - ISO 17901-1:2015 Part 1: Methods of measuring diffraction efficiency and associated optical characteristics of holograms
  - ISO 17901-2:2015 Part 2: Methods for measurement of hologram recording characteristics
- ISO 17907:2014 Ships and marine technology - Single point mooring arrangements for conventional tankers
- ISO/IEC 17913:2000 Information technology – 12,7mm 128-track magnetic tape cartridge for information interchange – Parallel serpentine format
- ISO/TS 17915:2013 Optics and photonics – Measurement method of semiconductor lasers for sensing
- ISO/TS 17919:2013 Microbiology of the food chain – Polymerase chain reaction (PCR) for the detection of food-borne pathogens – Detection of botulinum type A, B, E and F neurotoxin-producing clostridia
- ISO 17933:2000 GEDI - Generic Electronic Document Interchange
- ISO/TS 17938:2014 Health informatics – Semantic network framework of traditional Chinese medicine language system
- ISO 17937:2015 Dentistry - Osteotome
- ISO/TS 17948:2014 Health informatics – Traditional Chinese medicine literature metadata
- ISO/IEC 17960:2015 Information technology - Programming languages, their environments and system software interfaces - Code signing for source code
- ISO/IEC TS 17961:2013 Information technology - Programming languages, their environments and system software interfaces - C secure coding rules
- ISO/IEC 17963:2013 Web Services for Management (WS-Management) Specification
- ISO/TS 17969:2015 Petroleum, petrochemical and natural gas industries – Guidelines on competency for personnel
- ISO 17972 Graphic technology - Colour data exchange format (CxF/X)
  - ISO 17972-1:2015 Part 1: Relationship to CxF3 (CxF/X)
  - ISO 17972-2:2016 Part 2: Scanner target data (CxF/X-2)
  - ISO 17972-3:2017 Part 3: Output target data (CxF/X-3)
  - ISO 17972-4:2015 Part 4: Spot colour characterisation data (CxF/X-4)
- ISO/TS 17975:2015 Health informatics – Principles and data requirements for consent in the Collection, Use or Disclosure of personal health information
- ISO/IEC 17982:2012 Information technology – Telecommunications and information exchange between systems – Close Capacitive Coupling Communication Physical Layer (CCCC PHY)
- ISO 17987 Road vehicles – Local Interconnect Network (LIN)
  - ISO 17987-2:2016 Part 2: Transport protocol and network layer services
- ISO 17994:2014 Water quality – Requirements for the comparison of the relative recovery of microorganisms by two quantitative methods
- ISO 17995:2005 Water quality – Detection and enumeration of thermotolerant Campylobacter species
- ISO/IEC 17998:2012 Information technology - SOA Governance Framework
