= GUS reporter system =

Molecular biology technique

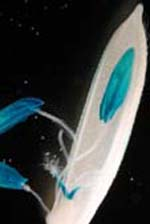
Rice anthers and style showing GUS expression

The GUS reporter system (GUS: β-glucuronidase) is a reporter gene system, particularly useful in plant molecular biology and microbiology. Several kinds of GUS reporter gene assay are available, depending on the substrate used. The term GUS staining refers to the most common of these, a histochemical technique.

== Purpose ==
The purpose of this technique is to analyze the activity of a gene transcription promoter (in terms of expression of a so-called reporter gene under the regulatory control of that promoter) either in a quantitative manner, involving some measure of activity, or qualitatively (on versus off) through visualization of its activity in different cells, tissues, or organs. The technique utilizes the uidA gene of Escherichia coli, which codes for the enzyme, β-glucuronidase; this enzyme, when incubated with specific colorless or non-fluorescent substrates, can convert them into stable colored or fluorescent products. The presence of the GUS-induced color indicates where the gene has been actively expressed. In this way, strong promoter activity produces much staining and weak promoter activity produces less staining.

The uidA gene can also be fused to a gene of interest, creating a gene fusion. The insertion of the uidA gene will cause production of GUS, which can then be detected using various glucuronides as substrates.

== Substrates ==
There are different possible glucuronides that can be used as substrates for the β-glucuronidase, depending on the type of detection needed (histochemical, spectrophotometrical, fluorimetrical). The most common substrate for GUS histochemical staining is 5-bromo-4-chloro-3-indolyl glucuronide (X-Gluc). X-Gluc is hydrolyzed by GUS into the product 5,5'-dibromo-4,4'-dichloro-indigo (diX-indigo). DiX-indigo will appear blue, and can be seen using light microscopy. This process is analogous to hydrolysis of X-gal by Beta-galactosidase to produce blue cells as is commonly practiced in bacterial reporter gene assays.

For other types of detection, common substrates are p-nitrophenyl β-D-glucuronide for the spectrophotometric assay and 4-methylumbelliferyl-beta-D-glucuronide (MUG) for the fluorimetric assay.

== History ==
The system was originally developed by Richard Anthony Jefferson during his Ph.D. at the University of Colorado at Boulder. He adapted the technique for the use with plants as he worked in the Plant Breeding Institute of Cambridge, between 1985 and 1987. Since then thousands of labs have used the system, making it one of the most widely used tools in plant molecular biology, as underlined by thousands of citations in scientific literature.

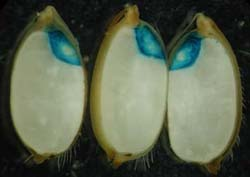
Rice embryo showing GUS expression

== Target organisms ==
An organism is suitable for a GUS assay if it lacks naturally occurring β-glucuronidase activity or if the activity is very low (background activity). For this reason, the assay is not useful in most vertebrates and many molluscs. Since there is no detectable GUS activity in higher plants, mosses, algae, ferns, fungi and most bacteria, the assay is ideally suited for gene expression studies in these organisms, and considered the reporter gene of choice for in plant science.

== Benefits and limitations ==
The GUS assay does not require the presence of any cofactors or ions for function. Beta-glucuronidase can function through a wide range of pH values, and is fairly resistant to thermal inactivation. However, GUS is susceptible to inhibition from certain heavy metal ions, such as Cu^{2+} and Zn^{2+}.

Additionally, the interpretation of the assay is limited by the movement of diX-indigo throughout the cell. DiX-indigo, can associate with lipids to diffuse far from the site of enzyme activity, which shows a lack of cytosolic localization and irregularity of substrate penetration. This can potentially lead to an incorrect interpretation of GUS protein localization. Despite a lack of cellular localization, nuclear localization of GUS has been well observed. GUS assays can be carried out in the presence of potassium ferricyanide to prevent the stain from diffusing.

== Other reporter systems ==
The GUS system is not the only available gene reporter system for the analysis of promoter activity. Other competing systems are based on e.g. luciferase, GFP, beta-galactosidase, chloramphenicol acetyltransferase (CAT), alkaline phosphatase. The use of one or the other system is mainly dependent on the organism of interest and the imaging and microscopy technologies available to the laboratories conducting the research.

== Other uses ==
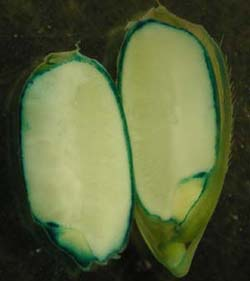
Rice seed aleurone layer showing GUSPlus expression

The GUS assay, as well as other reporter gene systems, can be used for other kinds of studies other than the classical promoter activity assay. Reporter systems have been used for the determination of the efficiency of gene delivery systems, the intracellular localization of a gene product, the detection of protein-protein or protein-DNA interactions, the efficiency of translation initiation signals and the success of molecular cloning efforts.
