= CAT III =

CAT III may refer to:

== Science and technology ==
- Chloramphenicol O-acetyltransferase, an enzyme
- CAT III, a measurement category of live electrical circuits
- CAT III, an instrument landing system category in aviation

== Other uses ==
- Category III, in the Hong Kong motion picture rating system

== See also ==
- List of Hong Kong Category III films
