= CAT I =

CAT I may refer to:

- Instrument landing system § ILS categories
- Chloramphenicol O-acetyltransferase I, an enzyme
- Carnitine O-palmitoyltransferase I, another enzyme
- Measurement category CAT I, a class of live electrical circuits used in measurement and testing
