= CAT II =

CAT II may refer to:

- Instrument landing system § ILS categories
- Chloramphenicol O-acetyltransferase II, an enzyme
- Carnitine O-palmitoyltransferase II, another enzyme
- Measurement category CAT II, a class of live electrical circuits used in measurement and testing
