= ReDNA =

ReDNA is an abbreviation referring to:

- Recombinant DNA
- Recognition element DNA
- Reporter DNA
