= Estrobolome =

Component of the human gut microbiome

The estrobolome is a component of the human gut microbiome made up of microbial genes and taxa that produce enzymes, most notably β-glucuronidase (GUS), that metabolize estrogens and influence their enterohepatic circulation and systemic bioavailability

The estrobolome directs how much estrogen is reabsorbed from the gut after hepatic conjugation and biliary excretion. By deconjugating estrogen glucuronides and other conjugates, estrobolome enzymes can change metabolites back into active estrogens, potentially having an effect on estrogen responsive physiology and disease risk. Research on the estrobolome covers enzymology (gut β-glucuronidase activity), taxonomic contributors, and associations with conditions like hormone sensitive cancers, dermal health, and menopausal changes, although causal links are still uncertain.

== Etymology and history ==
The term estrobolome is identified as the collection of microbial genes in the mammalian gut that are involved in the metabolism of estrogens. Early work tying intestinal bacteria to estrogen metabolism dates as early as the mid 20th century, with studies showing that microbial β-glucuronidase can deconjugate, or remove a conjugated molecule from, estrogen glucuronides. Estrogen, then, can be reabsorbed and reactivated in the gut. These findings formed the foundation upon which modern studies have looked into enterohepatic estrogen recycling and microbial interpretations of the estrobolome. The modern idea of the estrobolome has come to life in efforts to understand gene sets in the human gut microbiome by way of metagenomics and enzymology. Reviews have supported evidence linking gut microbial β-glucuronidase activity to systemic estrogen levels and hormone responsive physiology, suggesting that the estrobolome is a functional part of the microbiome with clinical relevance. By the 2020s, the estrobolome had become a known term in microbiology research with reviews noting its potential connection to menopause, breast cancer, disease, and other estrogen responsive conditions.

== Biological mechanism ==
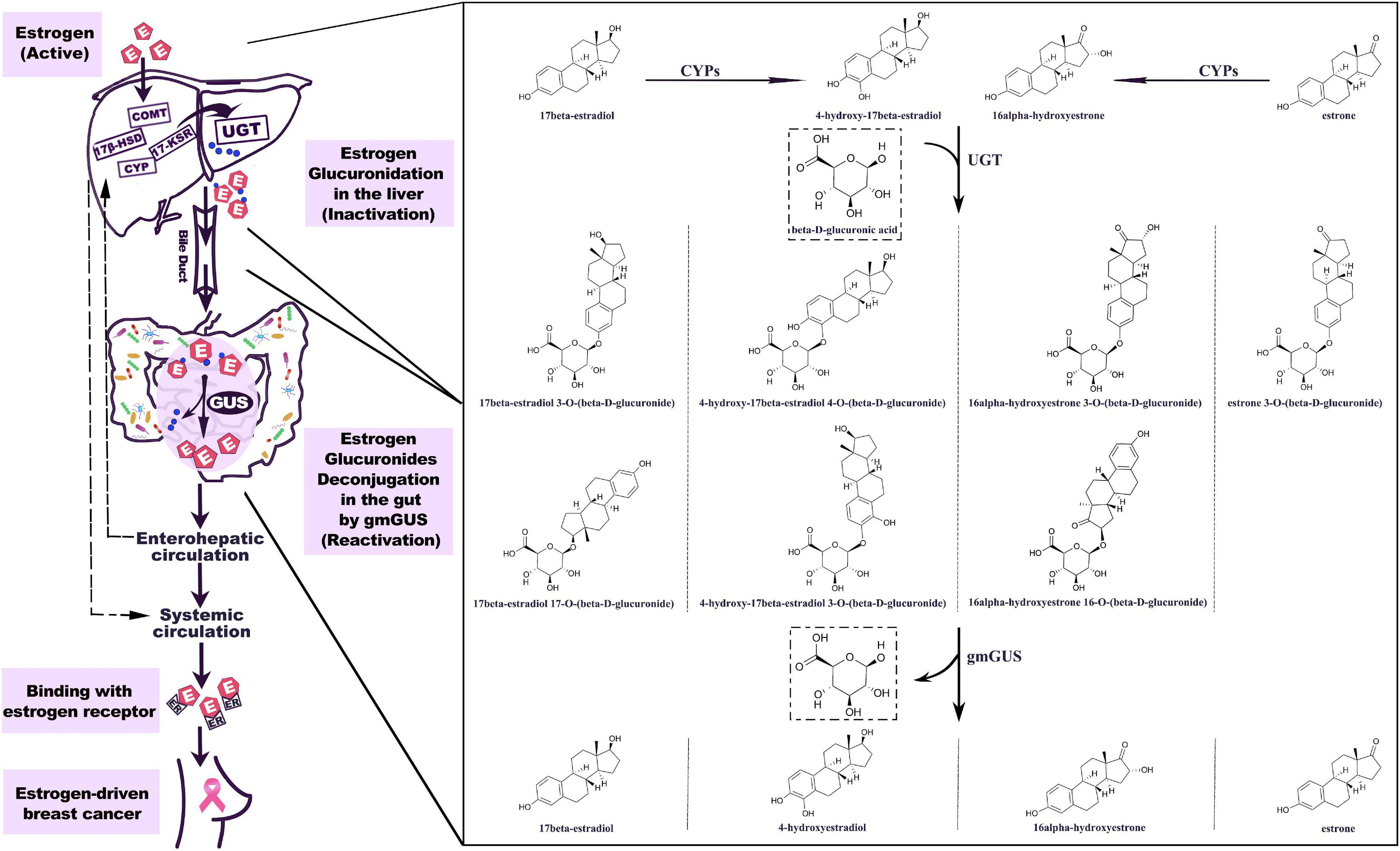
Estrogen metabolism affected by GUS. Conjugation cycle of estrogens in the liver and gut.

In humans, most estrogens are "turned off", or made water soluble, in the liver through conjugation reactions like glucuronidation and sulfation. These changes increase the solubility of estrogens and allow them to be excreted into bile and moved to the gut. Once in the gut, these estrogens can be metabolized by certain gut microbes. Many bacteria produce β-glucuronidase enzymes which hydrolyze estrogen glucuronides and remove the conjugated groups. This reaction changes them back into unconjugated active estrogens that can be reabsorbed through the intestinal wall and used in the blood. This process is one of the main ways the estrobolome influences estrogen levels in the blood.

The β-glucuronidase involved in this process of metabolism are not all the same. Different bacterial taxa encode specific forms of the enzyme. This means that the estrobolome's total activity depends on which bacteria are present and the biochemical profiles of the β-glucuronidase variants they produce. Researchers grade estrobolome activity through several approaches. For example, biochemical measurement of β-glucuronidase in fecal samples. Other examples include metabolic analysis of estrogen conjugates and their breakdown products, and metagenomic sequencing to identify and quantify β-glucuronidase gene families within the gut microbiome. The use of multiple methods helps distinguish between genetic potential for estrogen metabolism and enzymatic activity.

Multiple factors impact the way these microbial processes function, ranging from diet and liver function to antibiotics and intestinal transit time. These factors can influence how much conjugated estrogen enters the gut, how much steroid is deconjugated, and how much is reabsorbed. This helps explain why estrobolome activity and its effects can be different among individuals.

== Clinical relevance and associations ==
Research on the estrobolome is largely targeted towards microbial estrogen metabolism and its influence on hormone responsive physiology and disease in humans. Since β-glucuronidase can change the balance between conjugated and unconjugated estrogens, differences in estrobolome conditions has been explored as a potential contributor to differences in systemic estrogen availability.

Observational studies and reviews have shown associations between β-glucuronidase activity and estrogen receptor-positive breast cancer. Higher fecal β-glucuronidase activity has been suggested as a factor that could increase circulating estrogen levels (although evidence is correlational and does not favor causation).

Changes in the estrobolome have also been related to menopause. Changes in estrogen production during the menopausal transition appear to align with changes in the gut microbiome, including differences in the amount of bacterial species that code for β-glucuronidase. Some studies suggest menopause associated microbiome changes could influence estrogen metabolite profiles.

Some research has suggested that the estrobolome may have an effect bone density, cardiovascular health, or dermal health. However, most findings are associative, and many expose several confounding factors - diet, body mass, antibiotic exposure, and alcohol use - all of which make it difficult to isolate the effect of microbial estrogen metabolism. Direct causation has not been observed in humans, and much of the current landscape of research supports caution in interpreting associations.

== Limitations and controversies ==
While the estrobolome has gained much traction in microbiome research, there are limitations in the available evidence. Much of current research is purely association-based, meaning that differences in β-glucuronidase activity or gut microbial composition in this context are correlated with hormone related conditions, but not demonstrated to contribute to disease. Reviews tend to emphasize that observational human studies are not without their flaws, and cannot control for diet, age, BMI, and other confounding factors that are known to influence estrogen levels.

There is also methodological inconsistency among studies. β-glucuronidase can be measured by enzymatic assays, metagenomics of GUS genes, metabolic profiling of estrogen conjugates, or multiple approaches. Importantly, these techniques do not always work together perfectly. For example, metagenomic detection of β-glucuronidase encoding genes does not necessarily imply estrogen deconjugation. Interpretation of results in the context of methods can differ vastly.

Another challenge is that β-glucuronidase is a broad enzyme with many other applications beyond estrogen metabolism. Microbial GUS enzymes also act on drugs, polyphenols, and other compounds. Due to this, measuring β-glucuronidase activity in fecal samples does not isolate estrogen-specific deconjugation.

While the concept of the estrobolome has increased in popularity, the idea has drawn some controversy. While useful as a heuristic, some scientists argue that defining a subset of genes as a discrete "-ome" might oversimplify a system that is much more complex. They mention that estrogen metabolism involves more than just β-glucuronidase, including, but not limited to, sulfatases, transport proteins, intestinal epithelial enzymes, and conjugation cycles in the liver. The term estrobolome focuses mainly on one class of microbial enzymes, so some researchers caution that it should be used with care and not focused on as the sole interpreter of estrogen metabolism.

== See also ==
- β-Glucuronidase
- Estrogen
- Human microbiome
