= Cat3 =

Cat 3 or CAT3 may refer to:

- Category 3 cable, an unshielded twisted pair cable
- Nanaimo/Long Lake Water Airport (ICAO airport code), Canada
- Cognitive Abilities Test 3, a test of reasoning abilities undertaken by students in the UK and Canada
- CAT III, an instrument landing system category
- CAT III, a measurement category used to classify live electric circuits
- LTE User Equipment Category 3
