= Gluten Intolerance Group =

Gluten-free diet support organization

- Founded: 1974; 52 years ago
- Founder: Elaine Hartsook
- Type: Nonprofit
- Registration no.: GIG Cares: 86-2142240
- Legal status: 501(c)(3)
- Purpose: Gluten-free diet
- Location(s): Auburn, Washington; Lacey, Washington; Sebastian, Florida
- CEO: Cynthia Kelly
- COO: Channon Quinn
- Website: gluten.org

The Gluten Intolerance Group (GIG) is a 501(c)(3) non-profit organization founded in 1974 to increase awareness and support of a gluten-free diet. It is most well-known for its food product certification program, the Gluten-Free Certification Organization.

== History ==
Elaine Hartsook, a dietitian at the University of Washington, founded the Gluten Intolerance Group in 1974 to "support and educate individuals impacted by gluten-related disorders" and formed its first support group in 1983. Just before Hartsook died in 1996, she handed leadership over to Cynthia Kelly, who remains CEO to the present day. The Gluten-Free Certification Organization was established in 2005 and greatly expanded after being taken over in 2008 by Channon Quinn, who later became GIG's COO and CEO of GIG Cares. In 2007, GIG acquired the Gluten-Free Restaurant Awareness Program to work with restaurants producing gluten-free options, and later revamped this program as the Gluten-Free Food Service.

In 2020, during the COVID-19 pandemic GIG participated in the Giving Back to Our Gluten-Free Heroes campaign to assist workers who were required gluten-free diets, and joined other celiac and gluten-free organizations in opposing temporary changes by the U.S. Food and Drug Administration to allow food manufacturers to change the formulation of their products without necessarily having to update their ingredients list.

== Programs ==
=== Gluten-Free Certification Organization ===
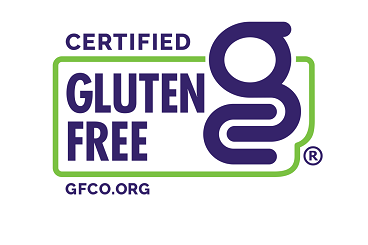
Mark for a product that has been certified by the GFCO

The Gluten-Free Certification Organization (GFCO) was established in 2005 as a first-of-its-kind independent certification program for gluten-free products. The program and all its services are accredited to ISO 17021 or 17065. The process of certification involves multiple steps, starting with a company submitting an application to GFCO that provides detailed information about their gluten-free products and how those products are created. Then these products are tested using multiple methods for detecting the presence of gluten, such as enzyme-linked immunosorbent assay. If a product is found to contain 10 ppm or less of gluten, then it is allowed to display the GFCO certification mark on its packaging. After this, companies must undergo annual audits and ongoing testing to remain in compliance. According to is own reporting, the organization certified "9,300 products from more than 800 brands worldwide" during 2022.

In 2024 the group Moms Across America conducted their study of GFCO-certified products and found that 15% of a random product sampling contained higher levels of gluten than GFCO's reported threshold.

=== Gluten-Free Food Service ===
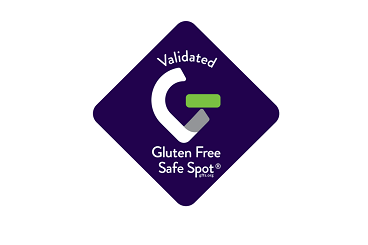
Mark for a Validated Gluten-Free Safe Spot

What was initially called the Gluten-Free Restaurant Awareness Program was relaunched in 2014 as the Gluten-Free Food Service (GFFS). GFFS is a program that performs in-person inspections of eating establishments and checks that they follow all best practices in preparing gluten-free food. Locations that pass this assessment are labeled as Validated Gluten-Free Safe Spots (originally called their Gluten-free Restaurant and Foodservice Safety Program until rebranding in 2020). GFFS also offers a coaching program to help guide food providers through the validation process.

Chef to Plate, launched in 2007, is another program under the GFFS umbrella that partners with restaurants and aims to raise awareness of gluten-free options and locations.

GFFS is managed by Lindsey Yeakle, who joined GIG in 2016.

=== GIG Cares ===
A registered charity formed in 2021 to fight food insecurity, GIG Cares expands the work of Cutting Costs for Celiacs, a program created by teenager Lexie Van Den Heuvel in 2013. It consists of a food relief program that provides gluten-free products, a gluten-free diet education program, and volunteer advocacy. GIG Cares also provides outreach to children in the form of "Teen Summits", "Kids Camps", and quarterly Generation GF Magazine and has taken ownership of GIG's support groups.
