= Glycyrrhizinate beta-glucuronidase =

Class of enzymes

Glycyrrhizinate β-glucuronidase

Identifiers
- EC no.: 3.2.1.128
- CAS no.: 102484-56-0

Databases
- BRENDA: enzyme data
- ExPASy: NiceZyme view
- KEGG: enzyme entry
- MetaCyc: metabolic pathway
- Rhea: reactions
- PDB structures: RCSB PDB PDBe PDBsum
- Gene Ontology: AmiGO / QuickGO
Search
- PMC: articles
- PubMed: articles
- NCBI: proteins

Glycyrrhizinate β-glucuronidase (EC 3.2.1.128) is an enzyme that catalyzes the chemical reaction

glycyrrhizin
H_{2}O
(1)
+
enoxolone

The enzyme characterised from Aspergillus niger removes the glycoside unit from the saponin, glycyrrhizin, to give 2-(β-D-glucpyranosyluronic acid)-D-glucuronic acid (1) and the steroid, enoxolone.

The enzyme is a hydrolase, specifically a glycosidase that hydrolyses O- and S-glycosyl compounds. The systematic name is glycyrrhizinate glucuronosylhydrolase. Other names include glycyrrhizin β-hydrolase, glycyrrhizin hydrolase, and glycyrrhizinic acid hydrolase.

== See also ==
- α-Glucuronidase
- β-Glucuronidase
- Glucuronosyl-disulfoglucosamine glucuronidase
