= GESMES/TS =

GESMES/TS (generic statistical message for time series) is a data model and message format appropriate for performing standardised exchange of statistical data and related metadata. It is based on the GESMES message (a UN/CEFACT standard using the EDIFACT syntax). Its most common use is in the exchange of official statistics.

The data model is optimised to represent multi-dimensional arrays of floating point numerical data where one dimension is time. The essential design pattern resembles a star schema. GESMES/TS promotes automation by its ability to explicitly declare the dimensions and allowable metadata fields in a standardised way. Software can then translate these declarations into a database schema suitable to hold the multi-dimensional data. This mechanism makes GESMES/TS versatile enough for efficient use in many domains.

The initial name of GESMES/TS was GESMES/CB (generic statistical message for central banks), but has been changed in order to reflect its wider application. The model and format are maintained under the auspices of the SDMX initiative. In this context, GESMES/TS is known as SDMX-EDI.
