= Alpha-glucuronidase =

Class of enzymes

alpha-glucuronidase

Identifiers
- EC no.: 3.2.1.139
- CAS no.: 37259-81-7

Databases
- IntEnz: IntEnz view
- BRENDA: BRENDA entry
- ExPASy: NiceZyme view
- KEGG: KEGG entry
- MetaCyc: metabolic pathway
- PRIAM: profile
- PDB structures: RCSB PDB PDBe PDBsum
- Gene Ontology: AmiGO / QuickGO
Search
- PMC: articles
- PubMed: articles
- NCBI: proteins

In enzymology, an alpha-glucuronidase (EC 3.2.1.139) is an enzyme that catalyzes the chemical reaction

an alpha-D-glucuronoside + H_{2}O $\rightleftharpoons$ an alcohol + D-glucuronate

Thus, the two substrates of this enzyme are alpha-D-glucuronoside and H_{2}O, whereas its two products are alcohol and D-glucuronate.

This enzyme belongs to the family of hydrolases, to be specific those glycosidases that hydrolyse O- and S-glycosyl compounds. The systematic name of this enzyme class is alpha-D-glucosiduronate glucuronohydrolase. This enzyme is also called alpha-glucosiduronase.

== Structural studies ==
As of late 2007, 13 structures have been solved for this class of enzymes, with PDB accession codes 1GQI, 1GQJ, 1GQK, 1GQL, 1H41, 1K9D, 1K9E, 1K9F, 1L8N, 1MQP, 1MQQ, 1MQR, and 1VJT.

== See also ==
- Beta-glucuronidase
- Glucuronosyl-disulfoglucosamine glucuronidase
- Glycyrrhizinate beta-glucuronidase
