= X-Gluc =

Names
- IUPAC name 5-Bromo-4-chloro-1H-indol-3-yl β-D-glucopyranosiduronic acid
- Other names 5-Bromo-4-chloro-3-indolyl-β-D-glucuronide

Identifiers
CAS Number	18656-89-8; 114162-64-0 (cyclohexylammonium salt)
3D model (JSmol)	Interactive image
ChemSpider	2015360
ECHA InfoCard	100.132.050
PubChem CID	2733579
CompTox Dashboard (EPA)	DTXSID10940105 DTXSID10921292, DTXSID10940105
- InChI: InChI=1S/C14H13BrClNO7/c15-4-1-2-5-7(8(4)16)6(3-17-5)23-14-11(20)9(18)10(19)12(24-14)13(21)22/h1-3,9-12,14,17-20H,(H,21,22)/t9-,10-,11+,12-,14+/m0/s1 Key: DHJFFLKPAYHPHU-BYNIDDHOSA-N; InChI=1/C14H13BrClNO7/c15-4-1-2-5-7(8(4)16)6(3-17-5)23-14-11(20)9(18)10(19)12(24-14)13(21)22/h1-3,9-12,14,17-20H,(H,21,22)/t9-,10-,11+,12-,14+/m0/s1 Key: DHJFFLKPAYHPHU-BYNIDDHOBP
- SMILES: Brc3ccc2c(c(O[C@@H]1O[C@H](C(=O)O)[C@@H](O)[C@H](O)[C@H]1O)c[nH]2)c3Cl

Properties
Chemical formula	C_{14}H_{13}BrClNO_{7}
Molar mass	422.61 g·mol^{−1}
- Except where otherwise noted, data are given for materials in their standard state (at 25 °C [77 °F], 100 kPa). Infobox references

X-Gluc is a chemical compound with the molecular formula C_{14}H_{13}BrClNO_{7}. It is used as a reagent to detect β-glucuronidase, an enzyme produced by the E. coli bacterium. It is used to detect E. coli contamination in food, water and the urinary tract. In addition, it is widely used in molecular biology experiments to mark and select the expression of target genes (GUS reporter system).

It is often preferred to other detection methods because it is fast (24-hour testing), relatively accurate ( <1% false negatives and <5% false positives ) and the result is easy to observe and interpret. The reagent is safe to transport and easy to store.

== See also ==
- Bacteriological water analysis
- X-gal
