= Reporter gene =

Technique in molecular biology

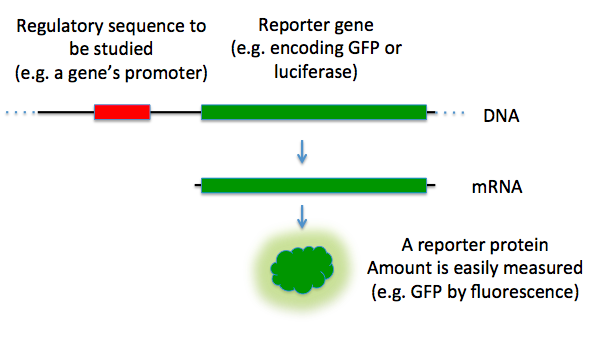
A diagram of a how a reporter gene is used to study a regulatory sequence.

Reporter genes are molecular tools widely used in molecular biology, genetics, and biotechnology to study gene function, expression patterns, and regulatory mechanisms. These genes encode proteins that produce easily detectable signals, such as fluorescence, luminescence, or enzymatic activity, allowing researchers to monitor cellular processes in real-time. Reporter genes are often fused to regulatory sequences of genes of interest, enabling scientists to analyze promoter activity, transcriptional regulation, and signal transduction pathways. Common reporter gene systems include green fluorescent protein (GFP), β-galactosidase (lacZ), luciferase, and chloramphenicol acetyltransferase (CAT), each offering distinct advantages depending on the experimental application. Their versatility makes reporter genes invaluable in fields such as drug discovery, gene therapy, and synthetic biology.

== Common reporters ==
To introduce a reporter gene into an organism, scientists place the reporter gene and the gene of interest in the same DNA construct to be inserted into the cell or organism. For bacteria or prokaryotic cells in culture, this is usually in the form of a circular DNA molecule called a plasmid. For viruses, this is known as a viral vector. It is important to use a reporter gene that is not natively expressed in the cell or organism under study, since the expression of the reporter is being used as a marker for successful uptake of the gene of interest.

Commonly used reporter genes that induce visually identifiable characteristics usually involve fluorescent and luminescent proteins. Examples include the gene that encodes jellyfish green fluorescent protein (GFP), which causes cells that express it to glow green under blue or ultraviolet light, the enzyme luciferase, which catalyzes a reaction with luciferin to produce light, and the red fluorescent protein from the gene dsRed. The GUS gene has been commonly used in plants, but luciferase and GFP are becoming more common.

A common reporter in bacteria is the E. coli lacZ gene, which encodes the protein beta-galactosidase. This enzyme causes bacteria expressing the gene to appear blue when grown on a medium that contains the substrate analog X-gal. An example of a selectable marker, which is also a reporter in bacteria, is the chloramphenicol acetyltransferase (CAT) gene, which confers resistance to the antibiotic chloramphenicol.

Because reporter genes such as lacZ, GFP, and luciferase are widely used in standardized plasmid constructs for gene expression studies, well-characterized reporter vectors are preserved as reference materials in public biological resource centres and non-profit repositories such as BCCM/GeneCorner and Addgene, supporting reproducibility in molecular biology research.

== History ==
=== Reporters by discovery year ===
Year	Gene name	Gene product	Significance	Assay	Ref.
1961	lacZ	β-galactosidase	François Jacob and Jacques Monod were awarded a Nobel Prize in 1965 for their work.	Enzyme assay, Histochemical (X-gal)	
1962	rfp	Red fluorescent protein		Microscopical, Spectrophotometry	
1979	cat	Chloramphenicol acetyltransferase	Used for measuring gene expression in eukaryotic cells.	Chloramphenicol acetylation	
1985	luc	Luciferase enzyme	Provided a sensitive bioluminescent reporter for gene expression studies.	Bioluminescence	
1987	gus	B-Glucuronidase	Became a widely used reporter gene in plant biology due to its high stability and easy detection in histochemical assays. Enabled visualization of gene expression patterns in plant tissues.	Histochemical, Fluorometric	
1994	gfp	Green fluorescent protein	Enabled real-time visualization of gene expression in live cells.	Fluorescence microscopy	

== Transformation and transfection assays ==
Many methods of transfection and transformation – two ways of expressing a foreign or modified gene in an organism – are effective in only a small percentage of a population subjected to the techniques. Thus, a method for identifying those few successful gene uptake events is necessary. Reporter genes used in this way are normally expressed under their own promoter (DNA regions that initiates gene transcription) independent from that of the introduced gene of interest; the reporter gene can be expressed constitutively ("always on") or inducibly. This independence is advantageous when the gene of interest is expressed under specific or hard-to-access conditions.

Reporter genes employ diverse mechanisms to visualize or quantify gene activity:

- Enzymatic reporters (e.g., LacZ) encode enzymes that catalyze reactions yielding a visible product. For example, β-galactosidase (encoded by LacZ) cleaves X-gal to produce a blue color, allowing easy identification of successful gene disruption (white colonies) versus intact genes (blue colonies).
- Bioluminescent reporters (e.g., luciferase) produce light via chemical reactions, enabling live-cell imaging and promoter studies without external light sources.
- Colorimetric reporters (e.g., CAT) generate detectable color changes when enzymes react with substrates, measurable via spectrophotometry or TLC.
- Selectable markers (e.g., Neo) confer antibiotic resistance (e.g., to G418), ensuring only transformed cells survive in selective media.

In the case of selectable-marker reporters such as CAT, the transfected population can be grown on a chloramphenicol-containing substrate. Only cells with the CAT gene survive, confirming successful transformation.

== Gene expression assays ==
Reporter genes can be used to assay for the expression of a gene of interest that is normally difficult to quantitatively assay. Reporter genes can produce a protein that has little obvious or immediate effect on the cell culture or organism. They are ideally not present in the native genome to be able to isolate reporter gene expression as a result of the gene of interest's expression.

To activate reporter genes, they can be expressed constitutively, where they are directly attached to the gene of interest to create a gene fusion. This method is an example of using cis-acting elements where the two genes are under the same promoter elements and are transcribed into a single messenger RNA molecule. The mRNA is then translated into protein. It is important that both proteins be able to properly fold into their active conformations and interact with their substrates despite being fused. In building the DNA construct, a segment of DNA coding for a flexible polypeptide linker region is usually included so that the reporter and the gene product will only minimally interfere with one another. Reporter genes can also be expressed by induction during growth. In these cases, trans-acting elements, such as transcription factors are used to express the reporter gene.

Reporter gene assay have been increasingly used in high throughput screening (HTS) to identify small molecule inhibitors and activators of protein targets and pathways for drug discovery and chemical biology. Because the reporter enzymes themselves (e.g. firefly luciferase) can be direct targets of small molecules and confound the interpretation of HTS data, novel coincidence reporter designs incorporating artifact suppression have been developed.

== Promoter assays ==
Reporter genes can be used to assay for the activity of a particular promoter in a cell or organism. In this case there is no separate "gene of interest"; the reporter gene is simply placed under the control of the target promoter and the reporter gene product's activity is quantitatively measured. The results are normally reported relative to the activity under a "consensus" promoter known to induce strong gene expression.

== Limitations and advancements ==
While reporter gene technology has become an essential component of molecular biology, its application still has limitations. One primary concern is the influence of genomic context on reporter expression. Reporter genes integrated into the genome can be subject to position-effect variegation, where the surrounding chromatin structure influences transcriptional activity. This can lead to inconsistent expression and complicate the interpretation of results, especially in stable cell lines and transgenic organisms. Additionally, reporter expression may not always accurately reflect the activity of the endogenous gene of interest due to differences in post-transcriptional regulation, mRNA stability, or translational efficiency.

Another common limitation is the cellular burden that reporter expression may impose. High levels of reporter protein production, such as fluorescent proteins or luciferases, can divert cellular resources, potentially impacting normal metabolism or physiology. This is particularly problematic in sensitive systems like stem cells or primary cell cultures, where even subtle changes in metabolism can influence cell behavior. Additionally, some reporter systems, like luciferase assays, require the addition of exogenous substrates (e.g., luciferin), adds complexity and may reduce reproducibility, particularly in live animal models where substrate availability can vary.

To address these challenges, several innovations have improved the reliability and flexibility of reporter gene technologies. One advancement involves the use of the 2A peptide, which allows the co-expression of multiple proteins from a single transcript without requiring a direct fusion. This approach enables the simultaneous expression of a gene of interest and a reporter while preserving the function of both. Additionally, split-reporter systems, which produce a functional signal only when two proteins of interest interact, have become widely used in studies of protein–protein interactions due to their low background activity and high specificity.

== Applications ==
=== Medical ===
Tracking expression has allowed for multiple investigations into the progression of diseased cells. Reporter genes have shown to provide critical insight into genes upregulated in cancer regulatory pathways as well as the identification into oncogenes and tumor suppressor genes. These have been used for further research into the development of therapeutics to stop further disease progression and metastasis. Gene therapy has also been tracked through the use of reporter genes. This allows for the monitoring of gene therapy vectors to see if they are achieving intended results as well as to monitor patient safety for short and long term periods. Therapeutics developed have benefited from the use of reporter genres such as a dual-reporter system developed for CRISPR/Cas9 models to monitor progression and success and benefits of being gene editing tools.

=== Research ===
The most commonly used application used for reporter genes has been for the identification of cis and trans acting elements. Through fusion to the promoter region of possible trans-cis acting elements, the change in fluorescence is measured and allows for tracking into transcriptional activity. This provides useful information into understanding the pathways these elements are involved in and its regulatory uses for cell development and growth. Immune responses are also a commonly used application of reporter genes and have benefited greatly through their use. They have allowed for further understanding in cell proliferation and differentiation into B-cells and T-cells during immune responses and have contributed to understanding activation through tracking cytokine signaling pathways.

The development of reporter cell lines have also emerged with the discovery and use of reporter genes. The cell lines are labelled with reporter genes to allow for fluorescent detection to help with identification into proteins used in cellular pathways and identification into protein localization. This has allowed for a simple way to study protein progression that doesn't permit further experimentation for introduction and fusion of a reporter gene as the reporter gene is already present in the cell line.

A more complex use of reporter genes on a large scale is in two-hybrid screening, which aims to identify proteins that natively interact with one another in vivo. The yeast two-hybrid (Y2H) system, developed in the late 1980s and early 1990s, was an immense advancement in the use of reporter genes to study protein-protein interactions in vivo. This technique takes advantage of transcription factors' modular nature, which often consists of separate DNA-binding and activation domains. By genetically fusing two proteins of interest to these domains, researchers can detect physical interactions between them through the activation of a downstream reporter gene. Due to the simple genetic nature of the Y2H system, this technique significantly increased the accessibility of protein-protein interaction studies without the requirement of protein purification or complex biochemical assays. Experimental Y2H data have played a pivotal role in building large-scale synthetic human interactomes and in dissecting mechanisms in human disease.

However, there are still some limitations. Y2H sometimes detects interactions that don't occur naturally or fails to detect weak or transient interactions. Due to its artificial setting, these failures could result from the absence of key factors such as post-translational modifications or compartmentalization. For example, Y2H has been shown to generate false positives due to indirect interactions mediated by host proteins, as demonstrated in studies of cyanobacterial PipX interactions where the self-interaction of PipX was found to be dependent on PII homologues from the host organism rather than a direct interaction.

Massively parallel reporter assays (MPRAs) and machine learning are newer ways to study gene regulation with reporter genes. One major use is in synthetic biology and gene therapy, where researchers can design better regulatory elements to control gene expression. For example, deep learning models trained on MPRA data have been used to optimize 5' untranslated regions (UTRs) for mRNA translation, enabling tailored designs that enhance gene-editing efficiency in the therapeutic context. This could make mRNA-based treatments more effective, as MPRAs also help identify how genetic variants affect gene expression, which is used in precision medicine and developing personalized treatments.

Machine learning models trained on MPRA data can predict how different sequences impact gene activity, making it easier to design reporter genes that respond in specific ways. Combining MPRAs with next-gen sequencing also makes reporter gene experiments faster and more scalable. These advances could even improve mRNA-based vaccines and therapeutics by optimizing untranslated regions (UTRs) to boost stability and translation. For instance, modular MPRAs have uncovered context-specific regulatory sequences linked to type 2 diabetes, revealing enhancer-promoter interactions dependent on cell-specific transcription factors like HNF1. Similarly, MPRA screens of cardiac enhancer variants have pinpointed functional noncoding sequences influencing QT interval variability, directly linking genetic variation to disease-associated gene dysregulation.

== See also ==
- Bioluminescence imaging
- Gene expression
- Gene knock-in
- Gene regulatory network
- GUS reporter system
- Molecular cloning
- Promoter (genetics)
- Selectable marker
- Synthetic biology
- Transcription factor
- Transfection
