= ISO 16750 =

International standard for automobile electronics

ISO 16750, Road vehicles – Environmental conditions and testing for electrical and electronic equipment, is a series of ISO standards which provide guidance regarding environmental conditions commonly encountered by electrical and electronic systems installed in automobiles and specify requirements and tests.

ISO 16750 has five parts:

- ISO 16750-1: General
- ISO 16750-2: Electrical loads
- ISO 16750-3: Mechanical loads
- ISO 16750-4: Climatic loads
- ISO 16750-5: Chemical loads

A similar series of ISO standards exists for electrical and electronic equipment for the drive system of electric vehicles, see ISO 19453, now withdrawn, see https://www.iso.org/standard/64930.html
