= ISO 17800 =

International Standard rule

ISO 17800 is an international standard for the Facility Smart Grid Information Model (FSGIM), which is currently under development. ISO 17800 is one of the International Organization for Standardization's group of standards for building environment design, and is the responsibility of ISO Technical Committee 205 (TC205).

== Standard documents ==
The first edition of ISO 17800 is detailed in the ISO 17800 standard document which was published in December 2017.

According to ISO, the scope of the standard is defined as:

ISO 17800:2017 provides the basis for common information exchange between control systems and end use devices found in single - and multi-family homes, commercial and institutional buildings, and industrial facilities that is independent of the communication protocol in use. It provides a common basis for electrical energy consumers to describe, manage and communicate about electrical energy consumption and forecasts.

ISO 17800:2017 defines a comprehensive set of data objects and actions that support a wide range of energy management applications and electrical service provider interactions including:

a) on-site generation,

b) demand response,

c) electrical storage,

d) peak demand management,

e) forward power usage estimation,

f) load shedding capability estimation,

g) end load monitoring (sub metering),

h) power quality of service monitoring,

i) utilization of historical energy consumption data, and

j) direct load control.

In addition to the printed text, the standard also contains a UML (Unified Modeling Language) model of all of the concepts in the standard.

== See also ==
- ISO 15118
- IEC 61850
- IEC 61851
- IEC 63110
