= X-gal =

Names
- IUPAC name 5-Bromo-4-chloro-1H-indol-3-yl β-D-galactopyranoside
- Systematic IUPAC name (2S,3R,4S,5R,6R)-2-[(5-Bromo-4-chloro-1H-indol-3-yl)oxy]-6-(hydroxymethyl)oxane-3,4,5-triol

Identifiers
| CAS Number | 7240-90-6 |
| 3D model (JSmol) | Interactive image |
| ChEBI | CHEBI:75055 |
| ChemSpider | 58680 |
| ECHA InfoCard | 100.027.855 |
| MeSH | X-gal |
| PubChem CID | 65181 |
| UNII | V595OG374W |
| CompTox Dashboard (EPA) | DTXSID901349452 |
- InChI: InChI=1S/C14H15BrClNO6/c15-5-1-2-6-9(10(5)16)7(3-17-6)22-14-13(21)12(20)11(19)8(4-18)23-14/h1-3,8,11-14,17-21H,4H2/t8-,11+,12+,13-,14-/m1/s1 Key: OPIFSICVWOWJMJ-AEOCFKNESA-N; InChI=1/C14H15BrClNO6/c15-5-1-2-6-9(10(5)16)7(3-17-6)22-14-13(21)12(20)11(19)8(4-18)23-14/h1-3,8,11-14,17-21H,4H2/t8-,11+,12+,13-,14-/m1/s1 Key: OPIFSICVWOWJMJ-AEOCFKNEBZ
- SMILES: Brc3ccc2c(c(O[C@@H]1O[C@@H]([C@H](O)[C@H](O)[C@H]1O)CO)c[nH]2)c3Cl

Properties
| Chemical formula | C_{14}H_{15}BrClNO_{6} |
| Molar mass | 408.629 |
- Except where otherwise noted, data are given for materials in their standard state (at 25 °C [77 °F], 100 kPa). verify (what is ?) Infobox references

X-gal (also abbreviated BCIG for 5-bromo-4-chloro-3-indolyl-β-D-galactopyranoside) is an organic compound consisting of galactose linked to a substituted indole. The compound was synthesized by Jerome Horwitz and collaborators in 1964. The formal chemical name is often shortened to less accurate but also less cumbersome phrases such as bromochloroindoxyl galactoside. The X from indoxyl may be the source of the X in the X-gal contraction. X-gal is often used in molecular biology to test for the presence of an enzyme, β-galactosidase, in the place of its usual target, a β-galactoside. It is also used to detect activity of this enzyme in histochemistry and bacteriology. X-gal is one of many indoxyl glycosides and esters that yield insoluble blue compounds similar to indigo dye as a result of enzyme-catalyzed hydrolysis.

A less often used but very similar (anomeric) compound is X-$\alpha$-gal (Xαgal, X-alpha-gal), or 5-Bromo-4-chloro-3-indolyl-α-D-galactopyranoside, which is hydrolyzed by α-galactosidase (EC 3.2.1.22) instead of β-galactosidase (EC 3.2.1.23).

== Uses ==
X-gal is an analog of lactose, and therefore may be hydrolyzed by the β-galactosidase enzyme which cleaves the β-glycosidic bond in D-lactose. X-gal, when cleaved by β-galactosidase, yields galactose and 5-bromo-4-chloro-3-hydroxyindole - 1. The latter then spontaneously dimerizes and is oxidized into 5,5'-dibromo-4,4'-dichloro-indigo - 2, an intensely blue product which is insoluble. X-gal itself is colorless, so the presence of blue-colored product may therefore be used as a test for the presence of active β-galactosidase. This also allows for bacterial β-galactosidase (so called lacZ ) to be used as a reporter in various applications.

Similarly, Xαgal is used as a reporter compound for α-galactosidase (e.g. Mel1 in yeast).

=== Reaction ===
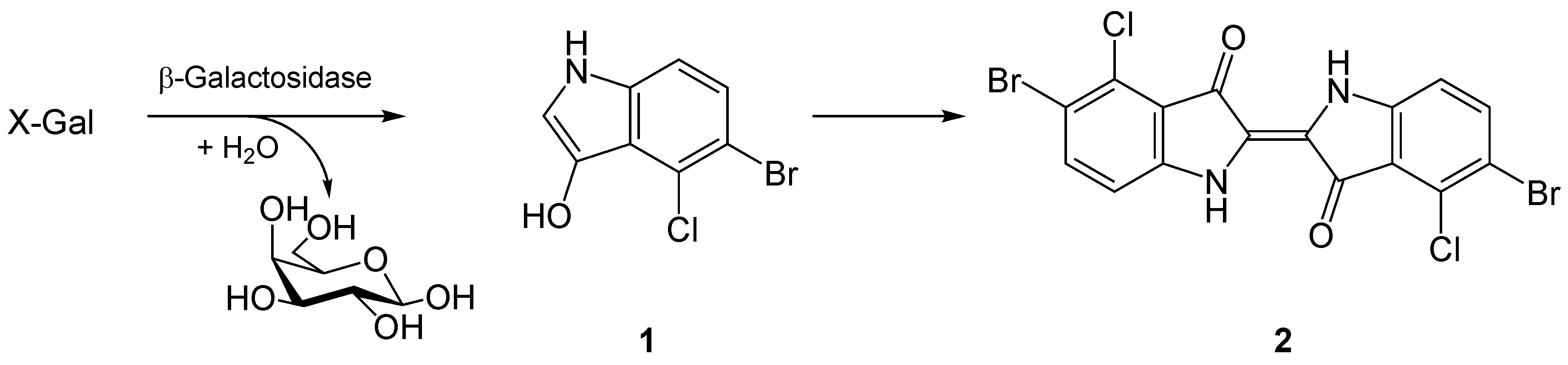

=== Cloning ===
In gene cloning, X-gal is used as a visual indication of whether a cell expresses a functional β-galactosidase enzyme in a technique called blue/white screening. This method of screening is a convenient way of distinguishing a successful cloning product from other unsuccessful ones.

The blue/white screening method relies on the principle of α-complementation of the β-galactosidase gene, where a fragment of the lacZ gene (lacZα) in the plasmid can complement another mutant lacZ gene (lacZΔM15) in the cell. Both genes by themselves produce non-functional peptides, however, when expressed together, as when a plasmid containing lacZα is transformed into a lacZΔM15 cells, they form a functional β-galactosidase. The presence of an active β-galactosidase may be detected when cells are grown in plates containing X-gal, the blue-colored product precipitated within cells resulted in the characteristic blue colonies. However, the multiple cloning site, where a gene of interest may be ligated into the plasmid vector, is located within the lacZα gene. Successful ligation therefore disrupts the lacZα gene, α-complementation is therefore also disrupted and no functional β-galactosidase can form, resulting in white colonies. Cells containing successfully ligated insert can then be easily identified by its white coloration from the unsuccessful blue ones. Example of cloning vectors used for this test are pUC19, pBluescript, pGem-T Vectors, and it also requires the use of specific E. coli host strains such as DH5α which carries the mutant lacZΔM15 gene. Often, the plate containing X-Gal also contains IPTG (isopropyl β-D-1-thiogalactopyranoside). IPTG is a chemical structure analogue of lactose. However, IPTG cannot be hydrolyzed by β-galactosidase. IPTG is used as an inducer that binds to lac repressor releasing the DNA and allowing transcription. The presence of IPTG in the agar plate therefore increases the synthesis of β-galactosidase.

==== Variants ====
X-gal has a number of variants, which are similar molecules with slight differences serving mainly to produce colors other than blue as a signal.

| Short name | Long name | Color |
|---|---|---|
| Blue-Gal, Bluo-Gal | 5-Bromo-3-indolyl β-D-galactopyranoside | Dark blue |
| Rose-Gal, Salmon-Gal, Y-Gal, Red-Gal | 6-Chloro-3-indolyl-β-D-galactopyranoside | Pink |
| Purple-β-D-Gal | 5-Iodo-3-indolyl-β-D-galactopyranoside | Purple |
| Magenta glucoside, Magenta-GLC, Magenta gal | 5-Bromo-6-chloro-3-indolyl-β-D-glucopyranoside | Magenta |
| Green-β-D-Gal | N-Methylindolyl-β-D-galactopyranoside | Green |
| MUG, MUGA | 4-Methylumbelliferyl β-D-galactopyranoside | Fluorescent (λ_{ex} = 365, λ_{em} = 455) |

=== Protein-protein interactions ===
In two-hybrid analysis, β-galactosidase may be used as a reporter to identify proteins that interact with each other. In this method, genome libraries may be screened for protein interaction using yeast or bacterial system. Where there is a successful interaction between proteins being screened, it will result to the binding of an activation domain to a promoter. If the promoter is linked to a lacZ gene, the production of β-galactosidase, which results in the formation of blue-pigmented colonies in the presence of X-gal, will therefore indicate a successful interaction between proteins. This technique may be limited to screening libraries of size of less than around 10^{6}. The successful cleavage of X-gal also creates a noticeably foul odor due to the volatilization of indole.

== See also ==
- X-Gluc
