= Measurement category =

IEC classification of live electric circuits

Schematic representation of measurement categories

Measurement category is a method of classification by the International Electrotechnical Commission (IEC) of live electric circuits used in measurement and testing of installations and equipment, usually in the relation within a building (residential or industrial).

The categories take into account the total continuous energy available at the given point of circuit, and the occurrence of impulse voltages. The energy can be limited by circuit breakers or fuses, and the impulse voltages by the nominal level of voltage.

== Measurement categories ==
Measuring circuits are subjected to working voltages and transient stresses from the circuit to which they are connected during measurement or test. When the measuring circuit is used to measure mains, the transient stresses can be estimated by the location within the installation at which the measurement is performed. When the measuring circuit is used to measure any other electrical signal, the transient stresses must be considered by the user to assure that they do not exceed the capabilities of the measuring equipment. In this standard, circuits are divided into the following measurement categories:

=== CAT I ===
Category I is for measurements performed on circuits not directly connected to mains.

Examples are measurements on circuits not derived from mains, and specially protected (internal) mains-derived circuits. In the latter case, transient stresses are variable; for that reason IEC 61010-1-5.4.1(g) requires that the transient withstand capability of the equipment is made known to the user.

=== CAT II ===
Measurement category II is for measurements performed on circuits directly connected to the low-voltage installation.

Examples are measurements on household appliances, portable tools and similar equipment.

=== CAT III ===
Measurement category III is for measurements performed in the building installation.

Examples are measurements on distribution boards, circuit-breakers, wiring, including cables, bus-bars, junction boxes, switches, socket-outlets in the fixed installation, and equipment for industries.

=== CAT IV ===
Measurement category IV is for measurements performed at the source of the high-voltage installation.

Examples are electricity meters and measurements on primary overcurrent protection devices and ripple control units.

== Clearances ==
The value of clearance relates to the electrical insulation, and the possibility of arc flash between two electrically energised parts (or between live and grounded parts). Higher voltages require higher clearances. For double insulation the clearances must be doubled.

The required values can vary from 0.04 mm for single insulation CAT II, 50 V, to 28 mm for double insulation CAT IV, 1000 V. The exact values are defined in the international standards. Such standards should be followed rigorously during the design process of the appropriate equipment.

== Impulse withstand voltages ==
Similarly to the clearances the value of required impulse withstand voltage varies from 500 V (CAT II, 50 V), to 12,000 V (CAT IV, 1000 V):

Working Voltage	Transient Overvoltage			
	CAT IV	CAT III	CAT II	CAT I
150 V	4,000 V	2,500 V	1,500 V	800 V
300 V	6,000 V	4,000 V	2,500 V	1,500 V
600 V	8,000 V	6,000 V	4,000 V	2,500 V
1000 V	12,000 V	8,000 V	6,000 V	4,000 V
Source Impedance	2 Ohms	2 Ohms	12 Ohms	30 Ohms
