= Glucuronosyl-disulfoglucosamine glucuronidase =

Identifiers
- EC no.: 3.2.1.56
- CAS no.: 37288-42-9

Databases
- IntEnz: IntEnz view
- BRENDA: BRENDA entry
- ExPASy: NiceZyme view
- KEGG: KEGG entry
- MetaCyc: metabolic pathway
- PRIAM: profile
- PDB structures: RCSB PDB PDBe PDBsum
- Gene Ontology: AmiGO / QuickGO
Search
- PMC: articles
- PubMed: articles
- NCBI: proteins

The enzyme glucuronosyl-disulfoglucosamine glucuronidase (EC 3.2.1.56) catalyzes the following chemical reaction:

3-D-glucuronosyl-N^{2},6-disulfo-β-D-glucosamine + H_{2}O $\rightleftharpoons$ D-glucuronate + N^{2},6-disulfo-D-glucosamine

This enzyme belongs to the family of hydrolases, specifically those glycosidases that hydrolyse O- and S-glycosyl compounds. The systematic name of this enzyme class is 3-D-glucuronsyl-N^{2},6-disulfo-β-D-glucosamine glucuronohydrolase. Other names in common use include glycuronidase, and 3-D-glucuronsyl-2-N,6-disulfo-β-D-glucosamine glucuronohydrolase.
