= Chloramphenicol acetyltransferase =

Class of enzymes

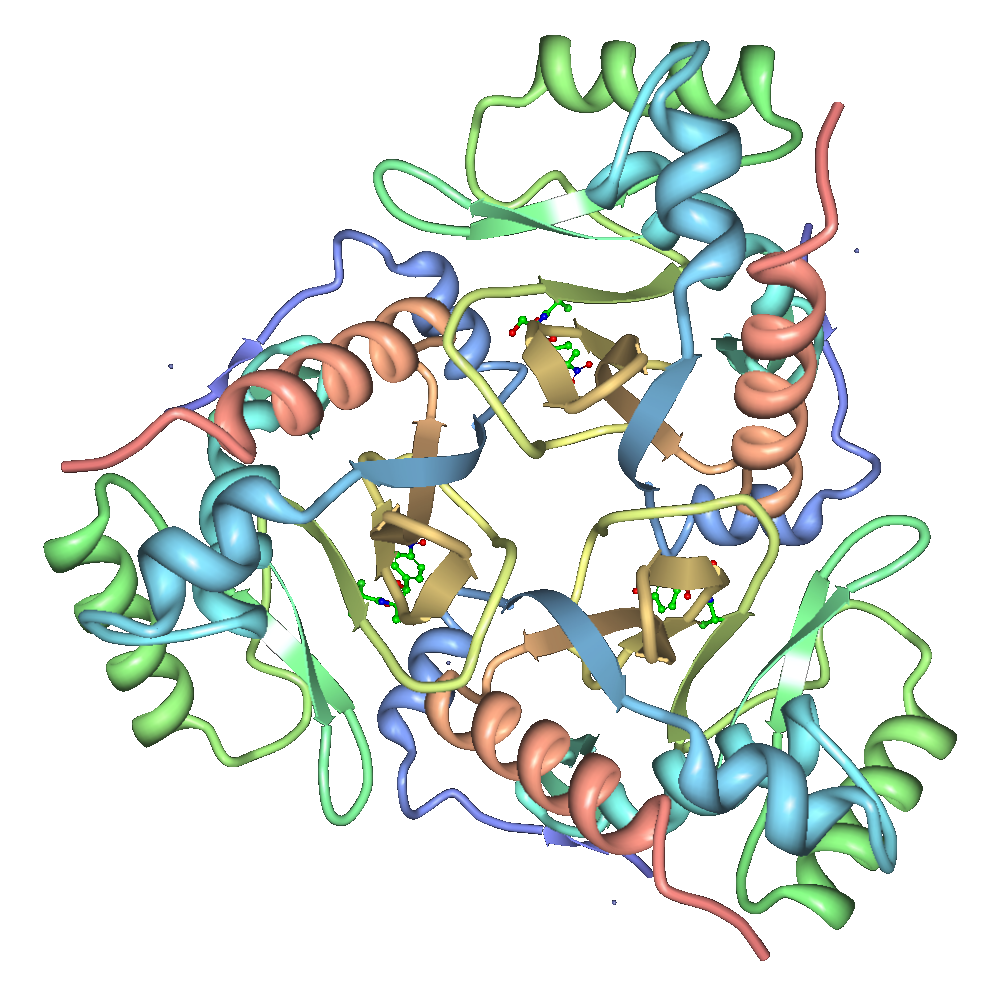
- Ribbon diagram of the chloramphenicol acetyltransferase trimer with chloramphenicol bound. From PDB: 3CLA.

Identifiers
- Symbol: CAT
- Pfam: PF00302
- InterPro: IPR001707
- PROSITE: PDOC00093
- SCOP2: 3cla / SCOPe / SUPFAM
Available protein structures:
- PDB: 1q23G:6-209 1pd5A:6-209 1nocB:6-209 1qca :1-205 3cla :1-205 4cla :1-205 1cia :1-205 1cla :1-205 2cla :1-205 IPR001707 PF00302 (ECOD; PDBsum)
- AlphaFold: IPR001707; PF00302

Chloramphenicol acetyltransferase

Identifiers
- EC no.: 2.3.1.28
- CAS no.: 9040-07-7

Databases
- BRENDA: enzyme data
- ExPASy: NiceZyme view
- KEGG: enzyme entry
- MetaCyc: metabolic pathway
- Rhea: reactions
- PDB structures: RCSB PDB PDBe PDBsum
- Gene Ontology: AmiGO / QuickGO
Search
- PMC: articles
- PubMed: articles
- NCBI: proteins

Chloramphenicol acetyltransferase (or CAT) is a bacterial enzyme (EC 2.3.1.28) that detoxifies the antibiotic chloramphenicol and is responsible for chloramphenicol resistance in bacteria.

== Function ==
Chloramphenicol acetyltransferase attaches an acetyl group from acetyl-CoA to chloramphenicol, which prevents the drug from binding to ribosomes. A histidine residue, located in the C-terminal section of the enzyme, plays a central role in its catalytic mechanism.

chloramphenicol
+
acetyl-CoA
chloramphenicol 3-acetate
+ coenzyme A

The crystal structure of the type III enzyme from Escherichia coli with chloramphenicol bound has been determined. CAT is a trimer of identical subunits (monomer Mr 25,000) and the trimeric structure is stabilised by a number of hydrogen bonds, some of which result in the extension of a beta-sheet across the subunit interface. Chloramphenicol binds in a deep pocket located at the boundary between adjacent subunits of the trimer, such that the majority of residues forming the binding pocket belong to one subunit while the catalytically essential histidine belongs to the adjacent subunit. His195 is appropriately positioned to act as a general base catalyst in the reaction, and the required tautomeric stabilisation is provided by an unusual interaction with a main-chain carbonyl oxygen.

== Application ==
CAT is used as a reporter system to measure the level of a promoter or its tissue-specific expression. The CAT assay involves monitoring acetylation of radioactively labeled chloramphenicol on a TLC plate; CAT activity is determined by looking for the acetylated forms of chloramphenicol, which have a significantly increased migration rate as compared to the unacetylated form.
