= Saturation =

Saturation, saturated, unsaturation or unsaturated may refer to:

== Chemistry ==
- Saturated and unsaturated compounds, a classification of compounds related to their ability to resist addition reactions
  - Degree of unsaturation
  - Saturated fat or saturated fatty acid
  - Unsaturated fat or unsaturated fatty acid
  - Non-susceptibility of an organometallic compound to oxidative addition
- Saturation of protein binding sites
- Saturation of enzymes with a substrate
- Saturation of a solute in a solution, as related to the solute's maximum solubility at equilibrium
  - Supersaturation, where the concentration of a solute exceeds its maximum solubility at equilibrium
  - Undersaturation, where the concentration of a solute is less than its maximum solubility at equilibrium

== Biology ==
- Oxygen saturation, a clinical measure of the amount of oxygen in a patient's blood
- Saturation pollination, a pollination technique
- Saturated mutagenesis, a form of site-directed mutagenesis
- Saturation (genetic), the observed number of mutations relative to the maximum amount possible
- Ocean saturation, more than 2.3 billion years ago: see "Great Oxygenation Event"
- Environmental saturation, environmental resistance to population growth: see "Logistic function" and "Carrying capacity"

== Physics ==
- Colorfulness § Saturation, see also: "Saturation intent", a rendering intent in color management
- Thermodynamic state at lower temperature bound of superheated steam
- Saturation (magnetic), the state when a magnetic material is fully magnetized
- Saturated fluid or saturated vapor, contains as much thermal energy as it can without boiling or condensing
  - Saturated steam
- Dew point, which is a temperature that occurs when atmospheric relative humidity reaches 100% and the air is saturated with moisture
- Saturated absorption, a set-up that enables the precise determination of the transition frequency of an atom between its ground state and an optically excited state

== Electronics ==
- Saturation velocity, the maximum velocity charge carrier in a semiconductor attains in the presence of very high electric fields
- Saturation, a region of operation of a transistor § Transistor as a switch
- Saturation current, limit of flowing current through a device

== Hydrology ==
- Saturated zone, below the groundwater table
- Unsaturated zone, above the groundwater table
- Soil saturation, water content in a soil

== Mathematics ==
- Saturation (commutative algebra), the inverse image of the localization of an ideal or submodule
- Saturated model, a concept in mathematical logic
- Saturation arithmetic, in arithmetic, a version of arithmetic in which all operations are limited to fixed range
- Saturation (graph theory), a categorization of vertices in graph theory
- Saturated measure, if every locally measurable set is also measurable
- Saturated multiplicatively closed sets, a concept in ring theory

== Music ==
- "Saturation (song)", a 1997 single by Australian group The Superjesus
- Saturation (Urge Overkill album), 1993
- Saturation (Vas Deferens Organization album), 1996
- Saturation (Brockhampton album), 2017 (Also see Saturation II and Saturation III)

== Other uses ==
- Market saturation, in economics
- Saturation diving

== See also ==
- Saturate (disambiguation)
- Saturation point (disambiguation)
