= Sesam =

Sesam, SESAM or SeSaM may refer to:

- SESAM (database), a relational database developed by Fujitsu Siemens
- SESAM (FEM), a structural analysis software
- Sesam (search engine), a Scandinavian internet search engine
- SeSaM-Biotech GmbH, a biotechnology company focusing on protein engineering
- Semiconductor saturable-absorber mirror, a component used in some lasers
- Sequence saturation mutagenesis (SeSaM), a molecular biology method for diversity creation by random mutagenesis

== See also ==
- Sesame (disambiguation)
- Various wild and cultivated plants in the genus Sesamum
