= James A. Wells =

American chemical biologist and protein engineer

- Born: April 28, 1950 (age 76)
- Education: University of California, Berkeley (B.A., 1973), Washington State University (Ph.D., 1979)
- Known for: Protein Engineering
- Spouse: Carol A Windsor
- Children: Julian James Windsor-Wells, Natalie Hope Windsor-Wells
- Awards: National Academy of Sciences
- Scientific career
- Fields: Chemical biology, protein engineering
- Institutions: University of California, San Francisco, Genentech, Inc., Sunesis Pharmaceuticals

James Allen Wells (born April 28, 1950) is a Professor of Pharmaceutical Chemistry and Cellular & Molecular Pharmacology at the University of California, San Francisco (UCSF) and a member of the National Academy of Sciences. He received his B.A. degrees in biochemistry and psychology from University of California, Berkeley in 1973 and a PhD in biochemistry from Washington State University with Ralph Yount in 1979. He completed his postdoctoral studies at Stanford University School of Medicine with George Stark in 1982. He is a pioneer in protein engineering, phage display, fragment-based lead discovery, cellular apoptosis, and the cell surface proteome.

== Career ==
=== Genentech (1982–1998) ===
Jim Wells began his independent research career as a co-founding member of the Protein Engineering Department at Genentech. At Genentech, Wells and his group pioneered "gain-of-function engineering" of enzymes (such as subtilisin), growth factors (human growth hormone), and antibodies by site-directed mutagenesis and protein phage display. Several biologic products derived directly from these efforts ranging from Pegvisomat (Somavert) an engineered growth hormone antagonist for treatment of acromegaly, humanization of the Bevacizumab (Avastin) a VEGF antagonist for treating cancers, and engineered proteases developed for popular laundry detergents by Genencor International. His group developed fundamental technologies (cassette mutagenesis, alanine scanning, protein phage display) and protein design principles ("hot-spots" in protein interfaces, additivity of mutational effects, receptor oligomerization in cytokines) commonly used for engineering enzymes, hormones, antibodies, and protein-protein interfaces. With Anthony Kossiakoff and Bart DeVos, they discovered the activation/dimerization mechanism of human growth hormone, a paradigm for cytokine signaling.

=== Sunesis Pharmaceuticals (1998–2005) ===
In 1998, Wells co-founded Sunesis Pharmaceuticals where he was CSO, and president. At Sunesis, the group developed a novel technology for site-directed fragment-based drug discovery, Tethering, and applied it to cancer and inflammation targets. They were among the first to develop potent small molecules to protein protein interfaces and cryptic allosteric sites considered undruggable. Several of the compounds discovered at Sunesis are now in clinical development. They also discovered the anti-inflammatory drug Lifitegrast, which was subsequently developed by SarCODE and is now sold by Shire for dry eye syndrome.

=== University of California, San Francisco (2005–current) ===
In 2005, Wells joined the faculty of Pharmaceutical Chemistry and Cellular & Molecular Pharmacology at UCSF. He founded the Small Molecule Discovery Center and served as Chair of Pharmaceutical Chemistry for 8 years. His own lab initially focused on the molecular basis of cell death as applied to cancer and inflammation through elaborating native substrates of caspases. His team designed a suite of engineered enzymes for dissecting protease signaling pathways (subtiligase and the SNIPer), E3 ligase substrates (the NEDDylator), a split-Cas9 for temporal editing, and allosteric inhibitors, split-kinases and new phosphospecific antibodies for probing protein phosphorylation pathways. In 2012, Wells founded the Antibiome Center as part of the Recombinant Antibody Network, devoted to generating human recombinant antibodies at a proteome-wide scale using high throughput platforms for antibody phage display. The Wells Lab now investigates how cell surface proteomes change in health and disease by applying mass spectrometry and protein and antibody engineering, to understand and disrupt human-disease-associated signaling processes. Several notable antibody technologies have also been developed including site specific methionine conjugation using redox-activated chemical tagging (ReACT), antibody-based chemically induced dimerizers (AbCID), antibody-Based PROTACs (AbTAC), antibody targeting a proteolytic neoepitope, and cytokine receptor-targeting chimeras (kineTAC).

== Awards ==
- 1990 Pfizer Award (given by the American Chemical Society for achievements in enzyme chemistry)
- 1997 Distinguished Alumni Award, Washington State University, Pullman, WA
- 1998 Christian B. Anfinsin Award presented by the Protein Society
- 1998 Vincent du Vignead Award presented by the American Peptide Society
- 1999 Elected Member to the National Academy of Sciences
- 2003 Hans Neurath Award presented by the Protein Society
- 2005 Braisted Award Lecture
- 2006 Perlman Lecture Award of the ACS Biotechnology Division
- 2009 Herman S. Bloch Award, University of Chicago, "for scientific excellence in industry"
- 2010 Merck Award given by the ASBMB
- 2011 Smissman Award in Medicinal Chemistry given by the American Chemical Society
- 2011 Inducted into the MedChem Hall of Fame by American Chemical Society
- 2015 Inducted into the American Academy of Arts & Science
- 2016 Elected Member of National Academy of Inventors
- 2017 WSU Regents' Distinguished Alumnus Award, Washington State University, Pullman, WA
- 2022 UCSF Distinguished Faculty Research Lecture, University of California, San Francisco, CA
