= SME =

SME may refer to:

== Economics ==
- Small and medium enterprises
- Socialist market economy, an economic system of China

== Organizations ==
=== Music ===
- SME Limited, UK audio turntable manufacturer
- SM Entertainment, South Korea
- Sony Music Entertainment, US
- Spontaneous Music Ensemble, UK, mid-1960s
- Stone Music Entertainment, South Korea

=== Other organizations ===
- SME (society), formerly Society of Manufacturing Engineers
- Society for Mining, Metallurgy, and Exploration
- Sun Microelectronics, a business unit of Sun Microsystems
- Shawnee Mission East, a high school in the Shawnee Mission School District in Kansas
- SME Bank, a Malaysian bank

== Science and technology ==
=== Computing ===
- Secure Memory Encryption, an AMD technology
- Scalable Matrix Extension, an ARM technology
- Structure mapping engine, in artificial intelligence and cognitive science
- SIGNAL Meta under Eclipse, an environment in the SIGNAL programming language

=== Other uses in science and technology ===
- Solar Mesosphere Explorer, an Earth observation satellite
- Standard-Model Extension, in quantum field theory
- Subsequent memory effect, in cognitive psychology
- Surface-mount equipment, for electronic assembly

== Other uses ==
- SME (newspaper), a Slovak daily
- Lake Cumberland Regional Airport, IATA code
- Strathmore railway station, Melbourne
- Subject-matter expert, an authority in a particular area or topic
- Suriname, license plate code

== See also ==
- same (disambiguation)
- SSME (disambiguation)
