= Y187 =

Y187 is a strain of yeast (Saccharomyces cerevisiae) used in biological research for two-hybrid screening. The strain has been sold commercially by Clontech since at least 2000 and is used as a partner with strain AH109 in mating assays.

Genotype of Y187: MATα, ura3-52, his3-200, ade2-101, trp1-901, leu2-3, 112, gal4Δ, met–, gal80Δ, URA3::GAL1_{UAS}-GAL1_{TATA}-lacZ.
