= Similarity transformation =

Similarity transformation may refer to:

- Similarity (geometry), for shape-preserving transformations
- Matrix similarity, for matrix transformations of the form A → P^{−1}AP

== See also ==
- Similarity (disambiguation)
- Transformation (disambiguation)
- Affine transformation
