= SSME (disambiguation) =

Space Shuttle Main Engine is a rocket engine used by NASA.

SSME may also refer to:

- Service science, management and engineering
- Society for the Study of Medical Ethics, successor of the London Medical Group
- Sri Lanka School of Military Engineering

== See also ==
- SME (disambiguation)
- Sesame (disambiguation)
