= AH109 =

Strain of yeast

AH109 is a strain of yeast (Saccharomyces cerevisiae) used in biological research for two-hybrid screening. The strain is sold commercially by Clontech and is used as a partner with strain Y187 in mating assays.
