= Saturate =

Saturate may refer to:

- Saturate (Breaking Benjamin album), 2002
- Saturate (Gojira album), 1999
- Saturate (Jeff Deyo album), 2002
- "Electronic Battle Weapon 8", a song by The Chemical Brothers, a shorter version of which was released under the name "Saturate"

== See also ==
- "Saturated", a song by Opshop, from the album You Are Here
- Saturation (disambiguation)
