= Sesame (disambiguation) =

Sesame is a flowering plant used as a seed crop.

Sesame or SESAME may also refer to:

== Science and technology ==
- the typographical Emphasis mark, sometimes called "sesame mark" or "sesame dot", used in typesetting vertical text or East Asian languages, and associated Unicode points SESAME DOT/WHITE SESAME DOT
- Sesame (framework), a Resource Description Framework (RDF) tool
- Sesame, various wild and cultivated plants in the genus Sesamum
- EAST syndrome, also called SeSAME syndrome, a syndrome of seizures, ataxia, and other signs
- Surface Electric Sounding and Acoustic Monitoring Experiments, a suite of experiments performed by the Philae comet lander
- Synchrotron-Light for Experimental Science and Applications in the Middle East, an international research facility in Jordan

== Arts, entertainment, and media ==
- Sesame (magazine), a magazine for students and alumni of the Open University; see Alumni magazine § S
- Sesame Street, a children's TV show

== See also ==
- Open Sesame (disambiguation)
- Sesam (disambiguation)
