= Saturation point =

Saturation point may refer to:

== Science ==
- Dew point, in meteorology
- Hydrocarbon dew point
- The maximum solubility of a solute at equilibrium

== Arts ==
- Saturation Point (album), a 1997 album by Tim Berne
- Saturation Point (novella), a 2024 novella by Adrian Tchaikovsky

== See also ==
- Saturation (disambiguation)
