= Similarity =

Similarity may refer to:

== In mathematics and computing ==
- Similarity (geometry), the property of sharing the same shape
- Matrix similarity, a relation between matrices
- Similarity measure, a function that quantifies the similarity of two objects
  - Cosine similarity, which uses the angle between vectors
  - String metric, also called string similarity
  - Semantic similarity, in computational linguistics

== In linguistics ==
- Lexical similarity
- Semantic similarity

== In other fields ==
- Similitude (model), in engineering, describing the geometric, kinematic and dynamic 'likeness' of two or more systems
- Similarity (psychology)
- Similarity (philosophy)
- Similarity (signal processing)
- Musical similarity
- Chemical similarity
- Similarity (network science)
- Structural similarity
- Similar (film), an upcoming South Korean film

== See also ==
- Same (disambiguation)
- Difference (disambiguation)
- Equality (mathematics)
- Identity (philosophy)
