= Sequence saturation mutagenesis =

Sequence saturation mutagenesis (SeSaM) is a chemo-enzymatic random mutagenesis method applied for the directed evolution of proteins and enzymes. It is one of the most common saturation mutagenesis techniques. In four PCR-based reaction steps, phosphorothioate nucleotides are inserted in the gene sequence, cleaved and the resulting fragments elongated by universal or degenerate nucleotides. These nucleotides are then replaced by standard nucleotides, allowing for a broad distribution of nucleic acid mutations spread over the gene sequence with a preference to transversions and with a unique focus on consecutive point mutations, both difficult to generate by other mutagenesis techniques. The technique was developed by Professor Ulrich Schwaneberg at Jacobs University Bremen and RWTH Aachen University.

== Technology, development and advantages ==
SeSaM has been developed in order to overcome several of the major limitations encountered when working with standard mutagenesis methods based on simple error-prone PCR (epPCR) techniques. These epPCR techniques rely on the use of polymerases and thus encounter limitations which mainly result from the circumstance that only single, but very rarely consecutive, nucleic acid substitutions are performed and that these substitutions occur usually at specific, favored positions only. In addition, transversions of nucleic acids are much less likely than transitions and require specifically designed polymerases with an altered bias. These characteristics of epPCR catalyzed nucleic acid exchanges together with the fact that the genetic code is degenerated decrease the resulting diversity on the amino acid level. Synonymous substitutions lead to amino acid preservation or conservative mutations with similar physico-chemical properties such as size and hydrophobicity are strongly prevalent. By non-specific introduction of universal bases at every position in the gene sequence, SeSaM overcomes the polymerase bias favoring transitory substitutions at specific positions but opens the complete gene sequence to a diverse array of amino acid exchanges.

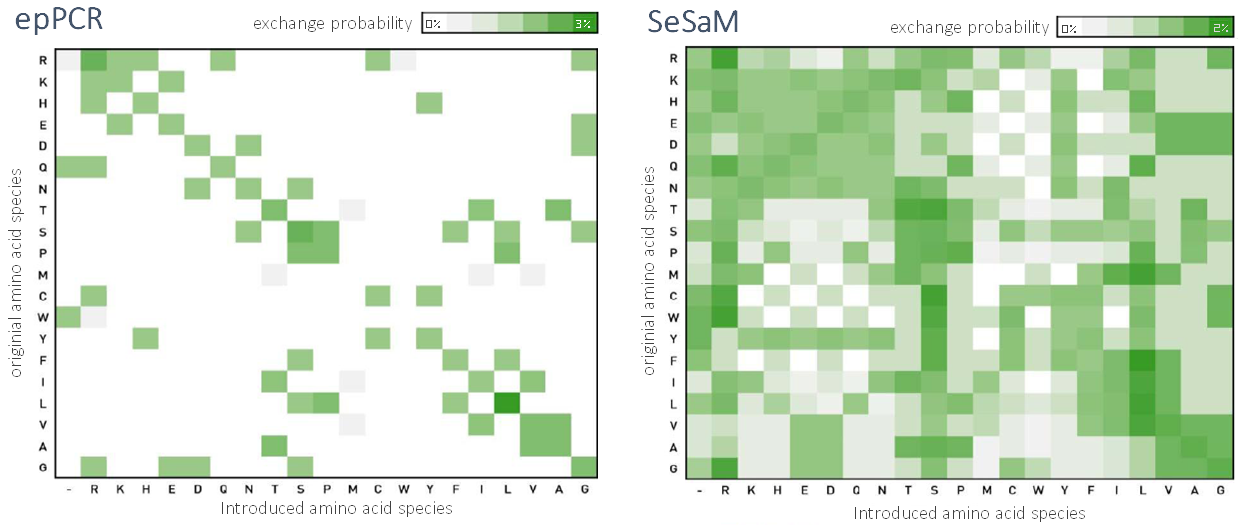
Comparison of the amino acid substitution pattern obtainable using standard epPCR methods (single nucleotide substitutions with transition bias) and the Sequence saturation mutagenesis method (introducing consecutive nucleotide substitutions with an increased ratio of transversions).

During the development of the SeSaM-method, several modifications were introduced that allowed for the introduction of several mutations simultaneously. Another advancement of the method was achieved by introduction of degenerate bases instead of universal inosine and the use of optimized DNA polymerases, further increasing the ratio of introduced transversions. This modified SeSaM-TV+ method in addition allows for and favors the introduction of two consecutive nucleotide exchanges, broadening strongly the spectrum of amino acids that may be substituted.

By several optimizations including the application of an improved chimera polymerase in Step III of the SeSaM-TV-II method and the addition of an alternative degenerate nucleotide for efficient substitution of thymine and cytosine bases and increased mutation frequency in SeSaM-P/R, generated libraries were further improved with regard to transversion number and the number of consecutive mutations was raised to 2–4 consecutive mutations with a rate of consecutive mutations of up to 30%.

== Procedure ==
The SeSaM-method consists of four PCR-based steps which can be executed within two to three days. Major parts include the incorporation of phosphorothioate nucleotides, the chemical fragmentation at these positions, the introduction of universal or degenerate bases and their replacement by natural nucleotides inserting point mutations.

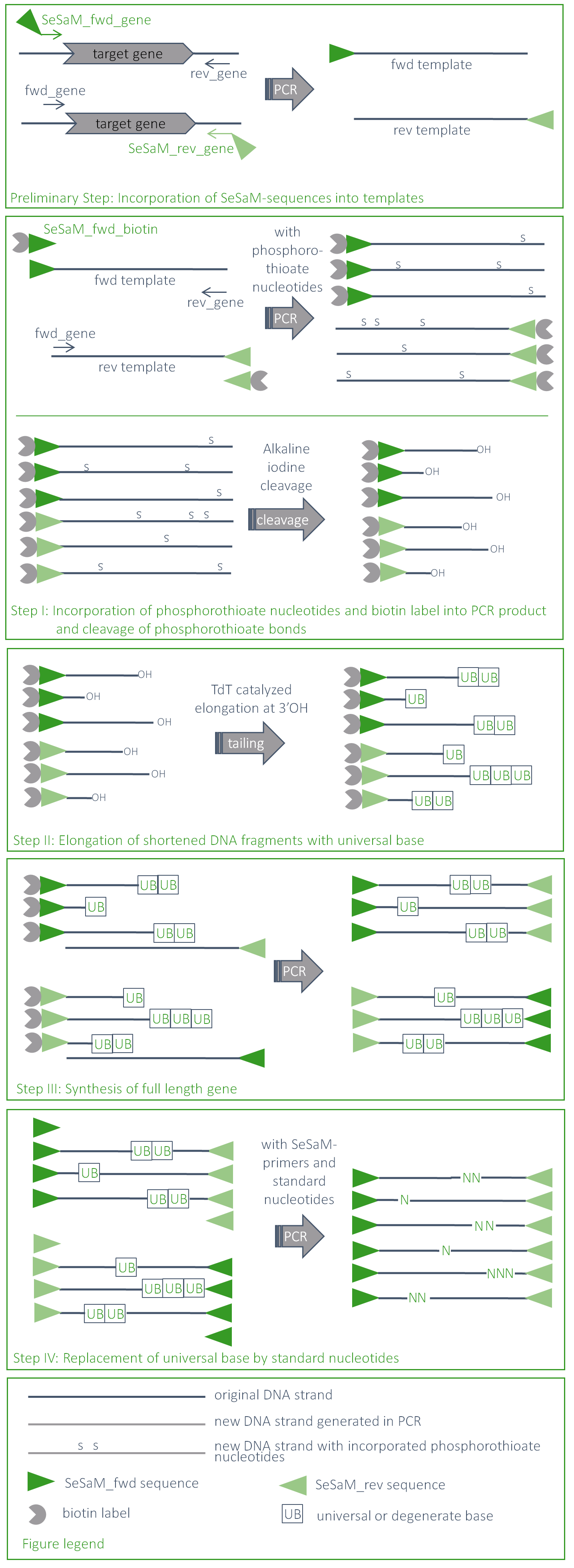
Experimental steps for generation of a non-biased random mutagenesis library using the sequence saturation mutagenesis method.

Initially, universal “SeSaM”-sequences are inserted by PCR with gene-specific primers binding in front of and behind the gene of interest. The gene of interest with its flanking regions is amplified to introduce these SeSaM_fwd and SeSaM_rev sequences and to generate template for consecutive PCR steps.

These generated so-called fwd template and rev templates are now amplified in a PCR reaction with a pre-defined mixture of phosphorothioate and standard nucleotides to ensure an even distribution of inserted mutations over the full length of the gene. PCR products of Step 1 are cleaved specifically at the phosphorothioate bonds, generating a pool of single-stranded DNA fragments of different lengths starting from the universal primer.

In Step 2 of SeSaM, the DNA single strands are elongated by one to several universal or degenerate bases (depending on the modification of SeSaM applied) catalyzed by terminal deoxynucleotidyl transferase (TdT). This step is the key step to introduce the characteristic consecutive mutations to randomly mutate entire codons.

Subsequently, in Step 3 a PCR is performed recombining the single stranded DNA fragments with the corresponding full-length reverse template, generating the full-length double stranded gene including universal or degenerate bases in its sequence.

By replacement of the universal/degenerate bases in the gene sequence by random standard nucleotides in SeSaM Step 4, a diverse array of full-length gene sequences with substitution mutations is generated, including a high load of transversions and subsequent substitution mutations.

== Applications ==
SeSaM is used to directly optimize proteins on amino acid level, but also to preliminarily identify amino acid positions to test in saturation mutagenesis for the ideal amino acid exchange. SeSaM has been successfully applied in numerous directed evolution campaigns of different classes of enzymes for their improvement towards selected properties such as cellulase for ionic liquid resistance, protease with increased detergent tolerance, glucose oxidase for analytical application, phytase with increased thermostability and monooxygenase with improved catalytic efficiency using alternative electron donors. SeSaM is patent protected by US770374 B2 in over 13 countries and is one of the platform technologies of SeSaM-Biotech GmbH.
