= Same =

Same may refer to:

- Sameness or identity
- Idem, Latin term for "the same" used in citations

== Places ==
- Same (Homer), an island mentioned by Homer in the Odyssey
- Same (polis), an ancient city
- Same, Timor-Leste, the capital of the Manufahi district
- Samé, Mali
- Same, Tanzania
- Same District, Tanzania

== Other uses ==
- SAME Deutz-Fahr, an Italian manufacturer of tractors, combine harvesters and engines
- SAME (tractors), a brand of SAME Deutz-Fahr
- S-adenosyl methionine or SAMe, an amino acid
- Society of American Military Engineers
- Specific Area Message Encoding, a coding system within the Emergency Alert System in the United States
- Governor Francisco Gabrielli International Airport, Argentina, ICAO code "SAME"
- "Same", a song by Snow Patrol from Final Straw
- "Same", a song by Oneohtrix Point Never from Age Of
- The Same, a punk band
- Syndrome of apparent mineralocorticoid excess, an autosomal recessive disorder causing hypertension and hypokalemia

== See also ==
- SameGame, a computer puzzle game
- Sam (disambiguation)
- Sami (disambiguation)
- Similarity (disambiguation)
