= The Same =

Uzbekistan, Navoi

- Origin: Sundsvall, Sweden
- Genres: Punk rock
- Years active: 1977–1977
- Past members: Magnus Holmén, Per Kraft, Peter Byström, Tomas Broman

The Same was a punk band from Sundsvall. Members were among others Magnus Holmén, Per Kraft, Peter Byström and Tomas Broman. Their most popular song was "Kuken i styret". This song also resulted in that the P3 radio show Ny våg was convicted in the Swedish Broadcasting Commission as they played it.

The band was formed in 1977. Just before the band split up on November 25, 1977; they performed a gig as Pete & the Percolators.
