= Saturated measure =

Measure in mathematics

In mathematics, a measure is said to be saturated if every locally measurable set is also measurable. A set $E$, not necessarily measurable, is said to be a locally measurable set if for every measurable set $A$ of finite measure, $E \cap A$ is measurable. $\sigma$-finite measures and measures arising as the restriction of outer measures are saturated.

If an outer measure $\mu^*$ has the property: for any set $E$ with finite $\mu^*(E)$, there is a finite $\mu^*$-measurable set $A$ containing $E$, then $\mu^*$ induces a saturated measure. Moreover, we can induce a saturated measure space $(X, \Sigma', \mu')$ from any measure space $(X, \Sigma, \mu)$, with $\Sigma'$ as the collection of all locally measurable sets in $(X, \Sigma, \mu)$ and $\mu'$ as the extension of $\mu$ by taking $\mu'=+\infty$ on $\Sigma'-\Sigma$. However, such extension is not the smallest extension of $\mu$ on $\Sigma'$ but $\mu''(E):=\sup\{\mu(A):A\in\Sigma,A\subseteq E,\mu(A)<+\infty\}$.
