= SeSaM-Biotech GmbH =

- Company type: Private
- Industry: Biotechnology, contract research organization
- Founded: 2008
- Founder: Ulrich Schwaneberg, Jacobs University Bremen
- Headquarters: Aachen, Germany
- Services: Protein engineering projects, gene libraries, assay development, consulting, computational analyses
- Number of employees: 9 (2017)
- Website: www.sesam-biotech.com

SeSaM-Biotech GmbH (in short SeSaM-Biotech) is a biotechnology service company founded in 2008 in Bremen and localized in Aachen today.

The company has a main focus on Protein Engineering projects based on the QuESt (Quality Enzyme Solutions) strategy and gene library generation using its patented platform technology Sequence Saturation Mutagenesis.

== Company ==
The SeSaM-Biotech GmbH was founded in 2008 as a spin-off of Jacobs University Bremen by Ulrich Schwaneberg who had developed and improved the patented key technology Sequence Saturation Mutagenesis (SeSaM) in the preceding years, In 2012, SeSaM-Biotech moved to its new facilities at the Leibniz-Institute for Interactive Materials (DWI) in Aachen. Today, it is a small company in the growing Biotechnology sector providing mainly services to diverse customers from the Biotechnology industry. Starting from SeSaM library generation, SeSaM-Biotech now applies a variety of random and focused mutagenesis methods in combination with developing and applying high-throughput screening assays for the realization of extensive protein engineering projects according to the KnowVolution strategy. Besides, internal research is performed for the further development of the in-house techniques and the expansion of the product range beyond protein engineering service provision.

== Sequence Saturation Mutagenesis method ==
SeSaM has been developed by Prof. Schwaneberg and his group in order to overcome several of the major limitations encountered when working with standard mutagenesis methods based on simple error-prone PCR (epPCR) techniques. By non-specific introduction of universal or degenerate bases at every position in the gene sequence, SeSaM overcomes the polymerase bias favoring transitory substitutions at specific positions but opens the complete gene sequence to a diverse array of amino acid exchanges. With continuous research by SeSaM-Biotech and the Schwaneberg group, several modifications of the SeSaM method were introduced that especially allowed for the introduction of consecutive mutations and a further shift of the mutational bias towards transversion substitutions, generating a versatile tool for protein engineering and evolution.

== Services and products ==
SeSaM-Biotech holds the patent for the Sequence Saturation Mutagenesis method for random mutagenesis, but applies also additional techniques for random and focused mutagenesis such as the licensed OmniChange method. These mutagenesis methods are applied to generate gene libraries for customers or are used in comprehensive protein engineering projects including random and knowledge-based diversity generation, assay development and variant screening. Besides, SeSaM-Biotech offers single enzyme services for assay development, computational analysis and in the consulting sector. A line of business for the production and sales of premium reagents for biotechnology application is under development.
