= Open Sesame (disambiguation) =

Open sesame is a magical phrase in the story of Ali Baba.

Open Sesame may also refer to:

- Open Sesame (TV series), a children's television series based on Sesame Street
- Iftah Ya Simsim, an Arabic language children's TV series also based on Sesame Street whose name translates as "Open Sesame"
- Open Sesame (Freddie Hubbard album), 1960
- Open Sesame (Kool & the Gang album), 1976
  - "Open Sesame" (Kool & the Gang song), the title track
- Open Sesame (Shaft album)
- Open Sesame (Whodini album), 1987
- "Open Sesame" (Leila K song), 1992
- Open Sesame, a novel by Tom Holt
