= Ulrich Schwaneberg =

German chemist and protein engineer (born 1969)

- Born: 17 June 1969 (age 57); Waiblingen
- Citizenship: German
- Education: University of Stuttgart
- Scientific career
- Fields: Protein Engineering
- Workplaces: RWTH Aachen University
- Website: www.biotec.rwth-aachen.de/go/id/imne/

Ulrich Schwaneberg (born 17 June 1969 in Waiblingen, Germany) is a German chemist and protein engineer. He is the Chair of Biotechnology at RWTH Aachen University and member of the scientific board at the Leibniz Institute for Interactive Materials in Aachen. He specializes in directed evolution of proteins for material science applications and on the development of its methodologies. The latter comprise methods for diversity generation (e.g. PLICing, SeSaM, OmniChange, cepPCR, PePevo), as well as high-throughput screening systems (e.g. Fur-Shell). His work group has elucidated general design principles of enzymes by analyzing libraries that contain the full natural diversity of a hydrolase with single amino acid exchanges and developed strategies to efficiently explore the protein sequence space (e.g. KnowVolution) and discovered protein engineering principles.

== Career ==
Ulrich Schwaneberg studied chemistry at the University of Stuttgart and received his diploma in 1996. His doctoral studies were also conducted at University of Stuttgart in the Institute of Technical Biochemistry under the supervision of R. D. Schmid. After his graduation in July 1999, he joined the lab of Frances H. Arnold at California Institute of Technology as post-doctoral fellow for two years. In January 2002, he was appointed as professor at Jacobs University Bremen. In January 2009, he was appointed as head of the Institute of Biotechnology at RWTH Aachen University and in 2010 co-appointed to the scientific board of directors at the DWI Leibniz Institute for Interactive Materials. Furthermore, he serves on the board of directors in the Bioeconomy Science Center that aims at advancing and focussing research efforts in the area of bioeconomy in the state of North Rhine-Westphalia and serves as speaker of the industry lab HICAST (Henkel Innovation Campus for Advanced and Sustainable Technologies) at RWTH Aachen University

He is a co-inventor on a number of patents of several improved enzymes which have been transferred into industrial use. In 2008, he also co-founded the SeSaM-Biotech GmbH which offers directed evolution services In 2013, he received a visiting professorship for senior international scientists of the Chinese Academy of Sciences, in 2015 a specially appointed professorship at Osaka University, in 2016 the 1.7 M € BMBF award for the Next Generation of Biotechnological Processes and in 2018 the Innovation Award of the BioRegions in Germany for a plant health release technology.
