= Mutagenesis (molecular biology technique) =

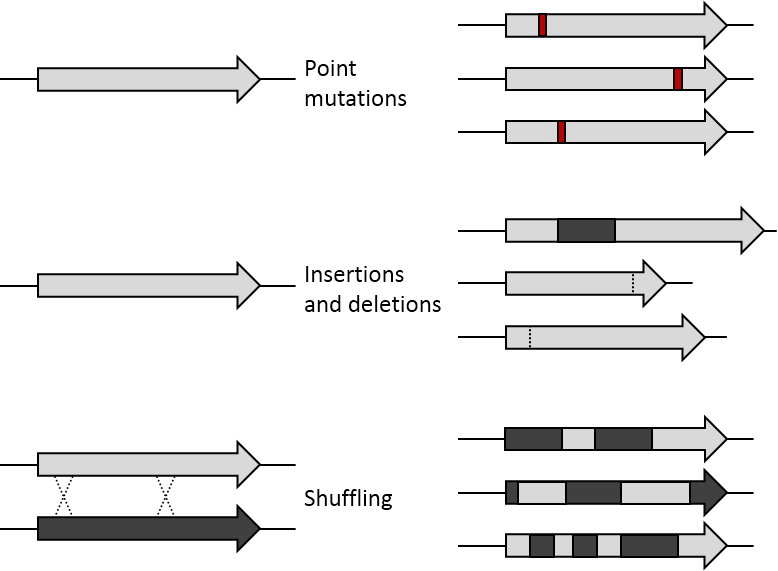
Types of mutations that can be introduced by random, site-directed, combinatorial, or insertional mutagenesis

In molecular biology, mutagenesis is an important laboratory technique whereby DNA mutations are deliberately engineered to produce libraries of mutant genes, proteins, strains of bacteria, or other genetically modified organisms. The various constituents of a gene, as well as its regulatory elements and its gene products, may be mutated so that the functioning of a genetic locus, process, or product can be examined in detail. The mutation may produce mutant proteins with interesting properties or enhanced or novel functions that may be of commercial use. Mutant strains may also be produced that have practical application or allow the molecular basis of a particular cell function to be investigated.

Many methods of mutagenesis exist today. Initially, the kind of mutations artificially induced in the laboratory were entirely random using mechanisms such as UV irradiation. Random mutagenesis cannot target specific regions or sequences of the genome; however, with the development of site-directed mutagenesis, more specific changes can be made, making it useful in situations that random mutagenesis is not. Since 2013, development of the CRISPR/Cas9 technology, based on a prokaryotic viral defense system, has allowed for the editing or mutagenesis of a genome in vivo. Other techniques of mutagenesis include combinatorial and insertional mutagenesis. Mutagenesis that is not random can be used to clone DNA, investigate the effects of mutagens, and engineer proteins. It also has medical applications such as helping immunocompromised patients, research and treatment of diseases including HIV and cancers, and curing of diseases such as beta thalassemia.

== Random mutagenesis ==
How DNA libraries generated by random mutagenesis sample sequence space. The amino acid substituted into a given position is shown. Each dot or set of connected dots is one member of the library. Error-prone PCR randomly mutates some residues to other amino acids. Alanine scanning replaces each residue of the protein with alanine, one-by-one. Site saturation substitutes each of the 20 possible amino acids (or some subset of them) at a single position, one-by-one.

Early approaches to mutagenesis relied on methods which produced entirely random mutations. In such methods, cells or organisms are exposed to mutagens such as UV radiation or mutagenic chemicals, and mutants with desired characteristics are then selected. Hermann Muller discovered in 1927 that X-rays can cause genetic mutations in fruit flies, and went on to use the mutants he created for his studies in genetics. For Escherichia coli, mutants may be selected first by exposure to UV radiation, then plated onto an agar medium. The colonies formed are then replica-plated, one in a rich medium, another in a minimal medium, and mutants that have specific nutritional requirements can then be identified by their inability to grow in the minimal medium. Similar procedures may be repeated with other types of cells and with different media for selection.

A number of methods for generating random mutations in specific proteins were later developed to screen for mutants with interesting or improved properties. These methods may involve the use of doped nucleotides in oligonucleotide synthesis, or conducting a PCR reaction in conditions that enhance misincorporation of nucleotides (error-prone PCR), for example by reducing the fidelity of replication or using nucleotide analogues. A variation of this method for integrating non-biased mutations in a gene is sequence saturation mutagenesis. PCR products which contain mutation(s) are then cloned into an expression vector and the mutant proteins produced can then be characterised.

In animal studies, alkylating agents such as N-ethyl-N-nitrosourea (ENU) have been used to generate mutant mice. Ethyl methanesulfonate (EMS) is also often used to generate animal, plant, and virus mutants.

In a European Union law (as 2001/18 directive), this kind of mutagenesis may be used to produce GMOs but the products are exempted from regulation: no labeling, no evaluation.

== Site-directed mutagenesis ==
Prior to the development of site-directed mutagenesis techniques, all mutations made were random, and scientists had to use selection for the desired phenotype to find the desired mutation. Random mutagenesis techniques have an advantage in terms of how many mutations can be produced; however, while random mutagenesis can produce a change in single nucleotides, it does not offer much control as to which nucleotide is being changed. Many researchers therefore seek to introduce selected changes to DNA in a precise, site-specific manner. Early attempts uses analogs of nucleotides and other chemicals were first used to generate localized point mutations. Such chemicals include aminopurine, which induces an AT to GC transition, while nitrosoguanidine, bisulfite, and N^{4}-hydroxycytidine may induce a GC to AT transition. These techniques allow specific mutations to be engineered into a protein; however, they are not flexible with respect to the kinds of mutants generated, nor are they as specific as later methods of site-directed mutagenesis and therefore have some degree of randomness. Other technologies such as cleavage of DNA at specific sites on the chromosome, addition of new nucleotides, and exchanging of base pairs it is now possible to decide where mutations can go.

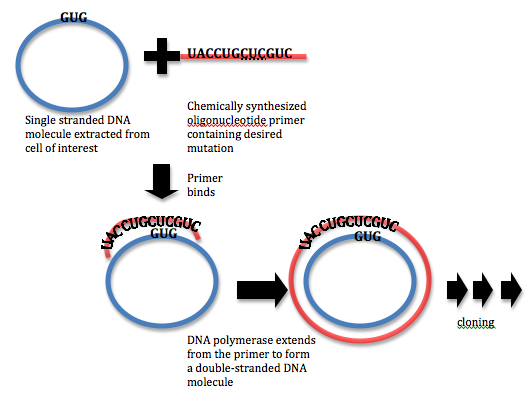
Simplified diagram of the site directed mutagenic technique using pre-fabricated oligonucleotides in a primer extension reaction with DNA polymerase

Current techniques for site-specific mutation originates from the primer extension technique developed in 1978. Such techniques commonly involve using pre-fabricated mutagenic oligonucleotides in a primer extension reaction with DNA polymerase. This methods allows for point mutation or deletion or insertion of small stretches of DNA at specific sites. Advances in methodology have made such mutagenesis now a relatively simple and efficient process.

Newer and more efficient methods of site directed mutagenesis are being constantly developed. For example, a technique called "Seamless ligation cloning extract" (or SLiCE for short) allows for the cloning of certain sequences of DNA within the genome, and more than one DNA fragment can be inserted into the genome at once.

Site directed mutagenesis allows the effect of specific mutation to be investigated. There are numerous uses; for example, it has been used to determine how susceptible certain species were to chemicals that are often used In labs. The experiment used site directed mutagenesis to mimic the expected mutations of the specific chemical. The mutation resulted in a change in specific amino acids and the effects of this mutation were analyzed.

Site saturation mutagenesis is a type of site-directed mutagenesis. This image shows the saturation mutagenesis of a single position in a theoretical 10-residue protein. The wild type version of the protein is shown at the top, with M representing the first amino acid methionine, and * representing the termination of translation. All 19 mutants of the isoleucine at position 5 are shown below.

The site-directed approach may be done systematically in such techniques as alanine scanning mutagenesis, whereby residues are systematically mutated to alanine in order to identify residues important to the structure or function of a protein. Another comprehensive approach is site saturation mutagenesis where one codon or a set of codons may be substituted with all possible amino acids at the specific positions.

== Combinatorial mutagenesis ==
Combinatorial mutagenesis is a site-directed protein engineering technique whereby multiple mutants of a protein can be simultaneously engineered based on analysis of the effects of additive individual mutations. It provides a useful method to assess the combinatorial effect of a large number of mutations on protein function. Large numbers of mutants may be screened for a particular characteristic by combinatorial analysis. In this technique, multiple positions or short sequences along a DNA strand may be exhaustively modified to obtain a comprehensive library of mutant proteins. The rate of incidence of beneficial variants can be improved by different methods for constructing mutagenesis libraries. One approach to this technique is to extract and replace a portion of the DNA sequence with a library of sequences containing all possible combinations at the desired mutation site. The content of the inserted segment can include sequences of structural significance, immunogenic property, or enzymatic function. A segment may also be inserted randomly into the gene in order to assess structural or functional significance of a particular part of a protein.

== Insertional mutagenesis ==
The insertion of one or more base pairs, resulting in DNA mutations, is also known as insertional mutagenesis. Engineered mutations such as these can provide important information in cancer research, such as mechanistic insights into the development of the disease. Retroviruses and transposons are the chief instrumental tools in insertional mutagenesis. Retroviruses, such as the mouse mammary tumor virus and murine leukemia virus, can be used to identify genes involved in carcinogenesis and understand the biological pathways of specific cancers. Transposons, chromosomal segments that can undergo transposition, can be designed and applied to insertional mutagenesis as an instrument for cancer gene discovery. These chromosomal segments allow insertional mutagenesis to be applied to virtually any tissue of choice while also allowing for more comprehensive, unbiased depth in DNA sequencing.

Researchers have found four mechanisms of insertional mutagenesis that can be used on humans. the first mechanism is called enhancer insertion. Enhancers boost transcription of a particular gene by interacting with a promoter of that gene. This particular mechanism was first used to help severely immunocompromised patients in need of bone marrow. Gammaretroviruses carrying enhancers were then inserted into patients. The second mechanism is referred to as promoter insertion. Promoters provide our cells with the specific sequences needed to begin translation. Promoter insertion has helped researchers learn more about the HIV virus. The third mechanism is gene inactivation. An example of gene inactivation is using insertional mutagenesis to insert a retrovirus that disrupts the genome of the T cell in leukemia patients and giving them a specific antigen called CAR allowing the T cells to target cancer cells. The final mechanisms is referred to as mRNA 3' end substitution. Human genes occasionally undergo point mutations causing beta-thalassemia, a condition which interrupts red blood cell function. To fix this problem the correct gene sequence for the red blood cells are introduced and a substitution is made.

== Homologous recombination ==
Homologous recombination can be used to produce specific mutation in an organism. Vector containing DNA sequence similar to the gene to be modified is introduced to the cell, and by a process of recombination replaces the target gene in the chromosome. This method can be used to introduce a mutation or knock out a gene, for example as used in the production of knockout mice.

== CRISPR ==
Since 2013, the development of CRISPR-Cas9 technology has allowed for the efficient introduction of different types of mutations into the genome of a wide variety of organisms. The method does not require a transposon insertion site, leaves no marker, and its efficiency and simplicity has made it the preferred method for genome editing.

== Gene synthesis ==
As the cost of DNA oligonucleotide synthesis falls, artificial synthesis of a complete gene is now a viable method for introducing mutations into a gene. This method allows for extensive mutation at multiple sites, including the complete redesign of the codon usage of a gene to optimise it for a particular organism.

== See also ==
- Genetic engineering
- Oncomouse
- Saturated mutagenesis
- Directed evolution
