= Saturation mutagenesis =

Technique used in protein engineering

Saturation mutagenesis of a single position in a theoretical 10-residue protein. The wild type version of the protein is shown at the top, with M representing the first amino acid methionine, and * representing the termination of translation. All 19 mutants at position 5 are shown below.

Saturation mutagenesis, or site saturation mutagenesis (SSM), or simply site saturation, is a random mutagenesis technique used in protein engineering, in which a single codon or set of codons is substituted with all possible amino acids at the position. There are many variants of the site saturation technique, from paired site saturation (saturating two positions in every mutant in the library) to scanning single-site saturation (performing a site saturation at each site in the protein, resulting in a library of size 20n, where n is the number of peptides in the protein, or n-site saturation, where n sites in a peptide would be site saturated, with a library size of 20^{n}, where if the length of your peptide is n, a complete randomization is obtained.

== Method ==
Depiction of one common way to clone a site-directed mutagenesis library (i.e., using degenerate oligos). The gene of interest is PCRed with oligos that contain a region that is perfectly complementary to the template (blue), and one that differs from the template by one or more nucleotides (red). Many such primers containing degeneracy in the non-complementary region are pooled into the same PCR, resulting in many different PCR products with different mutations in that region (individual mutants shown with different colors below).

Saturation mutagenesis is commonly achieved by site-directed mutagenesis PCR with a randomised codon in the primers (e.g. SeSaM) or by artificial gene synthesis, with a mixture of synthesis nucleotides used at the codons to be randomised.

Different degenerate codons can be used to encode sets of amino acids. Because some amino acids are encoded by more codons than others, the exact ratio of amino acids cannot be equal. Additionally, it is usual to use degenerate codons that minimise stop codons (which are generally not desired). Consequently, the fully randomised 'NNN' is not ideal, and alternative, more restricted degenerate codons are used. 'NNK' and 'NNS' have the benefit of encoding all 20 amino acids, but still encode a stop codon 3% of the time. Alternative codons such as 'NDT', 'DBK' avoid stop codons entirely, and encode a minimal set of amino acids that still encompass all the main biophysical types (anionic, cationic, aliphatic hydrophobic, aromatic hydrophobic, hydrophilic, small). In the case there is no restriction to use a single degenerate codon only, it is possible to reduce the bias considerably. Several computational tools were developed to allow high level of control over the degenerate codons and their corresponding amino acids.

| Degenerate codon | No. of codons | No. of amino acids | No. of stops | Amino acids encoded |
|---|---|---|---|---|
| NNN | 64 | 20 | 3 | All 20 |
| NNK / NNS | 32 | 20 | 1 | All 20 |
| NDT | 12 | 12 | 0 | RNDCGHILFSYV |
| DBK | 18 | 12 | 0 | ARCGILMFSTWV |
| NRT | 8 | 8 | 0 | RNDCGHSY |

== Applications ==
Saturation mutagenesis is commonly used to generate variants for directed evolution. Additionally, saturation mutagenesis is commonly used in deep mutational scanning (DMS).

== See also ==
- Sequence saturation mutagenesis
