= Takara Holdings =

Company in Kyoto, Japan

Takara Holdings Inc.
- Native name: 宝ホールディングス株式会社
- Romanized name: Takara Hōrudingusu kabushiki gaisha
- Company type: Public KK
- Traded as: TYO: 2531
- Industry: Drink industry
- Founded: 1925 June 09; 101 years ago
- Headquarters: Shimogyō-ku, Kyoto 600-8688, Japan
- Area served: Worldwide
- Key people: Hisashi Ohmiya (Chairman); Toshio Kakimoto (President)
- Products: Alcoholic beverages; Seasonings; Research reagents; Scientific instruments; Health foods
- Revenue: ▲JPY 225.3 billion (FY 2015) (US$ 1.99 billion) (FY 2015)
- Net income: ▲JPY 7 billion (Y 2015) (US$62.4 million) (FY 2015)
- Number of employees: 3,780 (consolidated, as of 31 March 2016)
- Website: Official website

Takara Holdings (宝ホールディングス株式会社, Takara Hōrudingusu kabushiki gaisha; stylized as TaKaRa) is a Japanese company based in Kyoto. The company is mainly involved in the production of beverages, food, printing and medical supplies.

== Divisions ==
=== Takara Shuzo ===
Takara Shuzo (宝酒造) Co. produces sake, other beverages, and seasonings. This division comprises the original business; the holding company including it was formed in 2001. Takara Shuzo also owns the Tomatin distillery of Highland single malt scotch whisky. Takara Shuzo Co. is the largest distiller of traditional shochu liquor in Japan.

=== Takara Bio ===
Clontech Laboratories was acquired from BD Biosciences in 2005. In 2007, Clontech was involved in litigation with Invitrogen over patents for RNase H minus reverse transcriptase.

Subsidiaries of Takara Bio Inc. include Takara Bio USA (formerly Clontech Laboratories), a Mountain View, California-based manufacturer of kits, reagents, instruments, and services for biological research, as well as regional subsidiaries in Europe, Korea, China, and India. The main offices of Takara Bio USA moved to San Jose in August 2021.
