= Dephosphorylation =

Biochemical process in which a phosphate group is removed from a molecule

In a signaling pathway, series of molecules, usually proteins, transmit messages and control processes within a cell in response to an environmental cue.

In biochemistry, dephosphorylation is the removal of a phosphate (PO^{3−}_{4}) group from an organic compound by hydrolysis. It is a reversible post-translational modification. Dephosphorylation and its counterpart, phosphorylation, activate and deactivate enzymes by detaching or attaching phosphoric esters and anhydrides. A notable occurrence of dephosphorylation is the conversion of ATP to ADP and inorganic phosphate.

Dephosphorylation employs a type of hydrolytic enzyme, or hydrolase, which cleaves ester bonds. The prominent hydrolase subclass used in dephosphorylation is phosphatase, which removes phosphate groups by hydrolysing phosphoric acid monoesters into a phosphate ion and a molecule with a free hydroxyl (–OH) group.

The reversible phosphorylation-dephosphorylation reaction occurs in every physiological process, making proper function of protein phosphatases necessary for organism viability. Because protein dephosphorylation is a key process involved in cell signalling, protein phosphatases are implicated in conditions such as cardiac disease, diabetes, and Alzheimer's disease.

== History ==
The discovery of dephosphorylation came from a series of experiments examining the enzyme phosphorylase isolated from rabbit skeletal muscle. In 1955, Edwin Krebs and Edmond Fischer used radiolabeled ATP to determine that phosphate is added to the serine residue of phosphorylase to convert it from its b to a form via phosphorylation. Subsequently, Krebs and Fischer showed that this phosphorylation is part of a kinase cascade. Finally, after purifying the phosphorylated form of the enzyme, phosphorylase a, from rabbit liver, ion exchange chromatography was used to identify phosphoprotein phosphatase I and II.

Since the discovery of these dephosphorylating proteins, the reversible nature of phosphorylation and dephosphorylation has been associated with a broad range of functional proteins, primarily enzymatic, but also including nonenzymatic proteins. Edwin Krebs and Edmond Fischer won the 1992 Nobel Prize in Physiology or Medicine for the discovery of reversible protein phosphorylation.

== Function ==
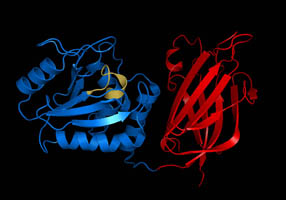
Crystallographic structure of human phosphatase and tensin homolog (PTEN). The active site of the blue N-terminal phosphatase domain is shown in yellow. The C-terminal C2 domain is shown in red.

Phosphorylation and dephosphorylation of hydroxyl groups belonging to neutral but polar amino acids such as serine, threonine, and tyrosine within specific target proteins is a fundamental part of the regulation of every physiologic process. Phosphorylation involves the covalent modification of the hydroxyl with a phosphate group through the nucleophilic attack of the alpha phosphate in ATP by the oxygen in the hydroxyl. Dephosphorylation involves removal of the phosphate group through a hydration reaction by addition of a molecule of water and release of the original phosphate group, regenerating the hydroxyl. Both processes are reversible and either mechanism can be used to activate or deactivate a protein. Phosphorylation of a protein produces many biochemical effects, such as changing its conformation to alter its binding to a specific ligand to increase or reduce its activity. Phosphorylation and dephosphorylation can be used on all types of substrates, such as structural proteins, enzymes, membrane channels, signaling molecules, and other kinases and phosphatases. The sum of these processes is referred to as phosphoregulation. The deregulation of phosphorylation can lead to disease.

=== Post-translational modification ===
During the synthesis of proteins, polypeptide chains, which are created by ribosomes translating mRNA, must be processed before assuming a mature conformation. The dephosphorylation of proteins is a mechanism for modifying behavior of a protein, often by activating or inactivating an enzyme. Components of the protein synthesis apparatus also undergo phosphorylation and dephosphorylation and thus regulate the rates of protein synthesis.

As part of posttranslational modifications, phosphate groups may be removed from serine, threonine, or tyrosine. As such, pathways of intracellular signal transduction depend on sequential phosphorylation and dephosphorylation of a wide variety of proteins.

=== ATP ===
ATP^{4−} + H_{2}O ⟶ ADP^{3−} + HPO^{2−}_{4} + H^{+}

Adenosine triphosphate, or ATP, acts as a free energy "currency" in all living organisms. In a spontaneous dephosphorylation reaction 30.5 kJ/mol is released, which is harnessed to drive cellular reactions. Overall, nonspontaneous reactions coupled to the dephosphorylation of ATP are spontaneous, due to the negative free energy change of the coupled reaction. This is important in driving oxidative phosphorylation. ATP is dephosphorylated to ADP and inorganic phosphate.

On the cellular level, the dephosphorylation of ATPases determines the flow of ions into and out of the cell. Proton pump inhibitors are a class of drug that acts directly on ATPases of the gastrointestinal tract.

=== Other reactions ===
Other molecules besides ATP undergo dephosphorylation as part of other biological systems. Different compounds produce different free energy changes as a result of dephosphorylation.

Molecule	Change in free energy
Acetyl phosphate	47.3 kJ/mol
Glucose-6-phosphate	13.8 kJ/mol
Phosphoenolpyruvate (PEP)	−61.9 kJ/mol
Phosphocreatine	43.1 kJ/mol

Psilocybin also relies on dephosphorylation to be metabolized into psilocin and further eliminated. No information on psilocybin's effect on the change in free energy is currently available.

=== Photosystem II ===
The first protein complex of the photosynthesis component light-dependent reactions is referred to as photosystem II. The complex utilizes an enzyme to capture photons of light, providing the greater photosynthesis process with all of the electrons needed to produce ATP. Photosystem II is particularly temperature sensitive, and desphosphorylation has been implicated as a driver of plasticity in responding to varied temperature. Accelerated protein dephosphorylation in photosynthetic thylakoid membranes occurs at elevated temperatures, directly impacting the desphosphorylation of key proteins within the photosystem II complex.

== Pathology ==
Excessive dephosphorylation of the membrane ATPases and proton pumps in the gastrointestinal tract leads to higher secretory rates of caustic peptic acids. These result in heartburn and esophagitis. In combination with Helicobacter pylori infection, peptic ulcer disease is caused by the elevated pH dephosphorylation elicits.

The microtubule-associated protein tau is abnormally hyperphosphorylated when isolated from the brain of patients who suffer from Alzheimer's disease. This is due to the dysfunction of dephosphorylation mechanisms at specific amino acids on the tau protein. Tau dephosphorylation is catalysed by protein phosphatase-2A and phosphatase-2B. Deficiency or modification of one or both proteins may be involved in abnormal phosphorylation of tau in Alzheimer's disease

Dephosphorylation has also been linked to cardiac disease, particularly the alteration of actin-myosin interactions that are key for providing the underlying force of a heartbeat. Dephosphorylation is a key part of the myosin cycling kinetics that directly control the actin-myosin interactions. When the dephosphorylation process is interrupted, calcium dependent cardiac contraction is impaired or fully disabled.

Research has also suggested that modifications to dephosphorylation impact physiological processes implicated in Diabetes mellitus. The kinetics of dephosphorylation of insulin receptor substrate-1/2, Akt, and ERK1/2, phosphoproteins are shown to be involved in insulin receptor signaling, and in vitro models demonstrate that changes to dephosphorylation kinetics impact upstream and downstream insulin stimulation.

== Treatment ==
Inhibition of proton pumps significantly decreases the acidity of the gastrointestinal tract, reducing the symptoms of acid-related diseases. The resulting change in pH decreases survival of the bacteria H.pylori, a major cause of peptic ulcer disease. Once the proton pump inhibitor eradicates this bacteria within the gut, reversing erosive reflux. Treating heart disease has improved with the use of drugs that inhibit AMPK via dephosphorylation. In the treatment of diabetes, sulfonylurea drugs are able to stimulate dephosphorylation of the glucose transporter GLUT4, decreasing insulin resistance and increasing and glucose utilization.

== Research applications ==
Dephosphorylation can play a key role in molecular biology, particularly cloning using restriction enzymes. The cut ends of a vector may re-ligate during a ligation step due to phosphorylation. By using a desphosphorylating phosphatase, re-ligation can be avoided. Alkaline phosphatases, which remove the phosphate group present at the 5′ terminus of a DNA molecule, are often sourced naturally, most commonly from calf intestine, and are abbreviated as CIP.

== Underlying evolutionary forces ==
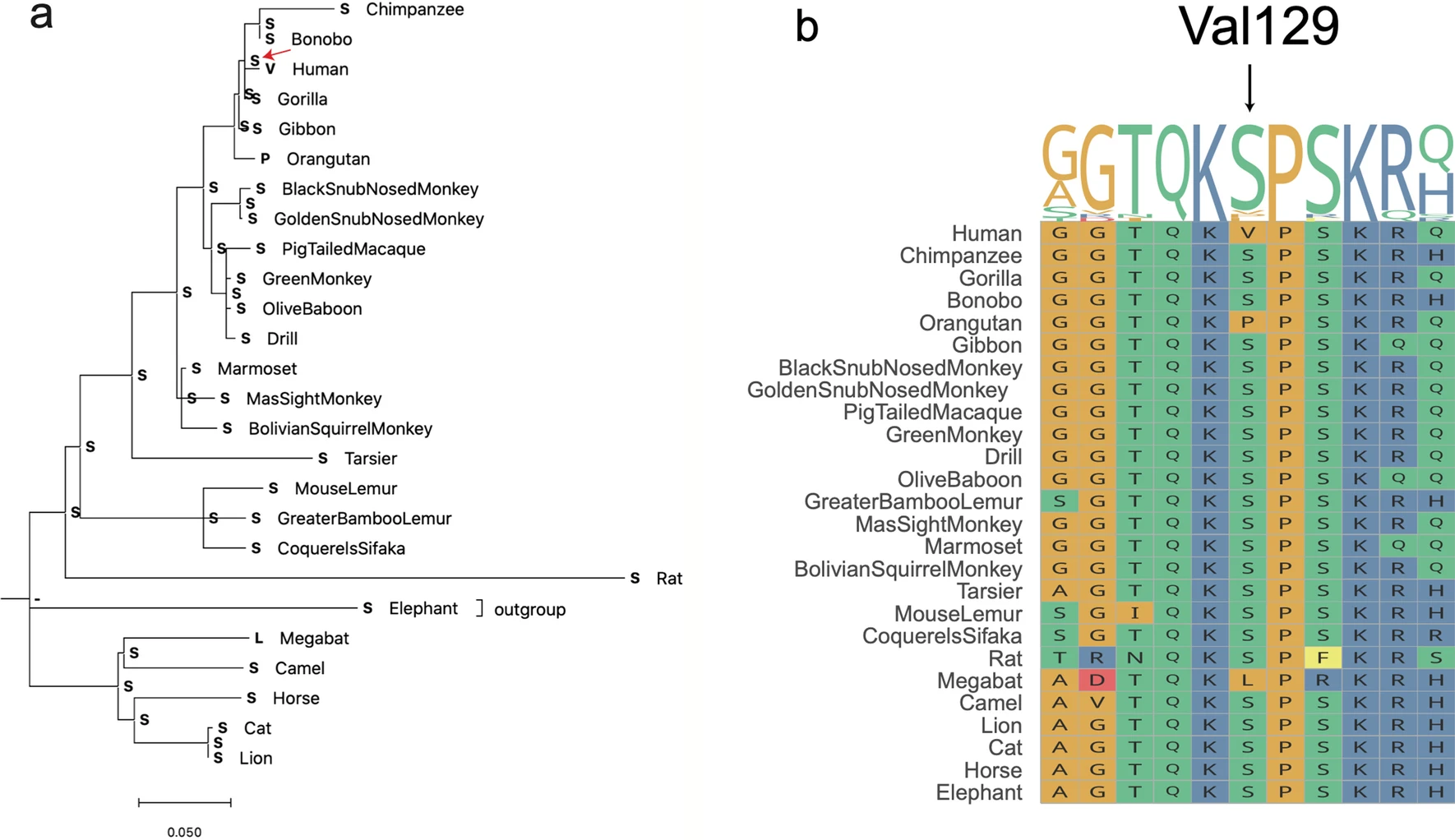
The ancestral state reconstruction and cross-species orthologous alignment. a Ancestral state reconstruction for human Val129 (red arrow) based on the Maximum Parsimony (MP) method in MEGA11. b Regional alignment comprising the human Val129 site (black arrow above the alignment).

The natural selection power for dephosphorylation is less understood. A recent study has found that IRF9, which is from the interferon-regulatory factors family (IRFs), a critical family for anti-viral immune response, could be influenced by natural selection during Human species evolution. The positive selection has been found on the amino acid site Val129 (NP_006075.3:p.Ser129Val) of human IRF9. The ancestral state (Ser129) is conserved among mammals, while the novel state (Val129) was fixed before the "out-of-Africa" event ~ 500,000 years ago. This young amino acid (Val129) may serve as a dephosphorylation site of IRF9. The dephosphorylation may affect the immune activity of IRF9.

== See also ==
- Phosphorylation
- Phosphatase
