= Hans Horst Meyer =

German pharmacologist

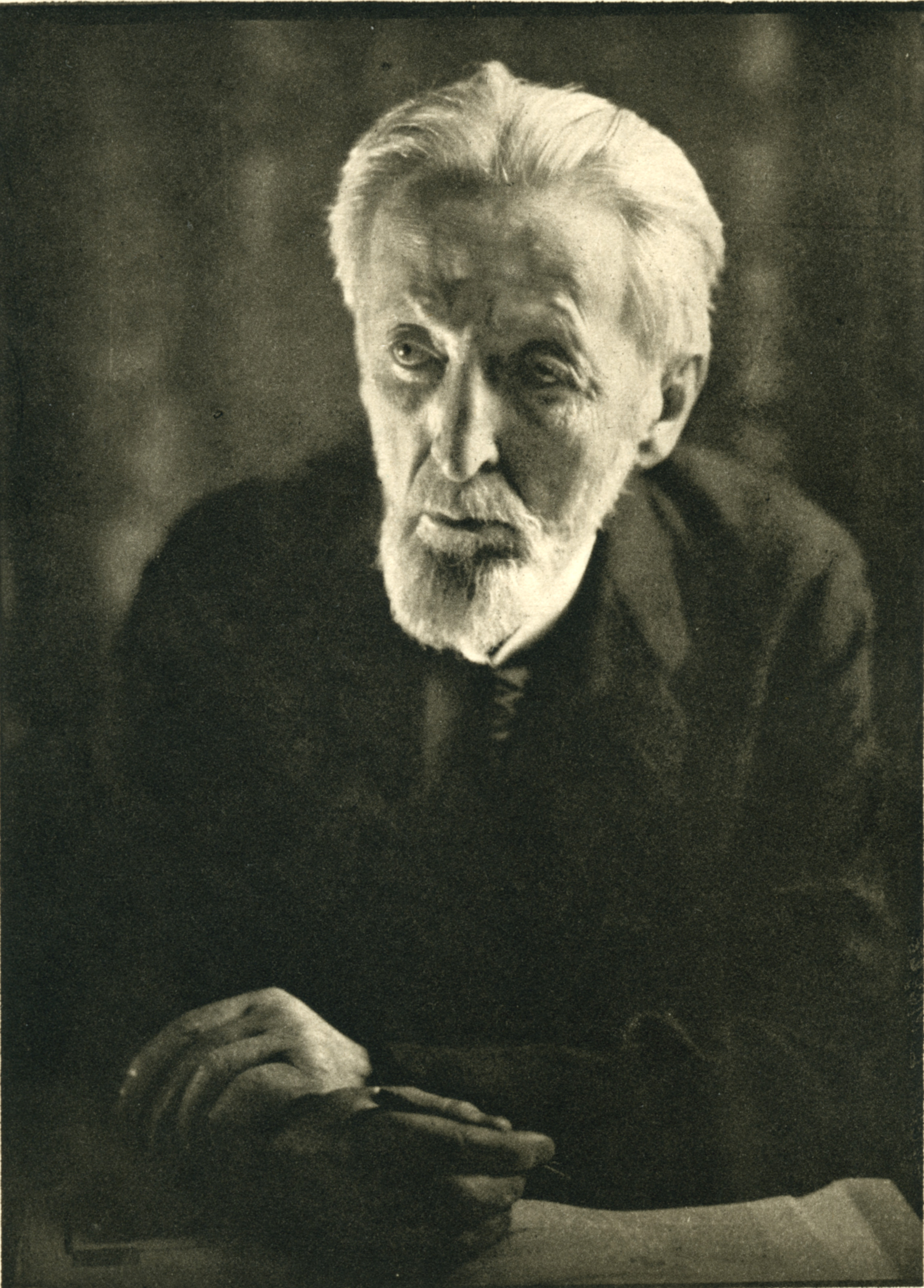
- Meyer in Vienna about 1930
- Born: 17 March 1853; Insterburg, Province of Prussia
- Died: 6 October 1939 (aged 86)
- Known for: Meyer-Overton hypothesis
- Scientific career
- Fields: Pharmacology

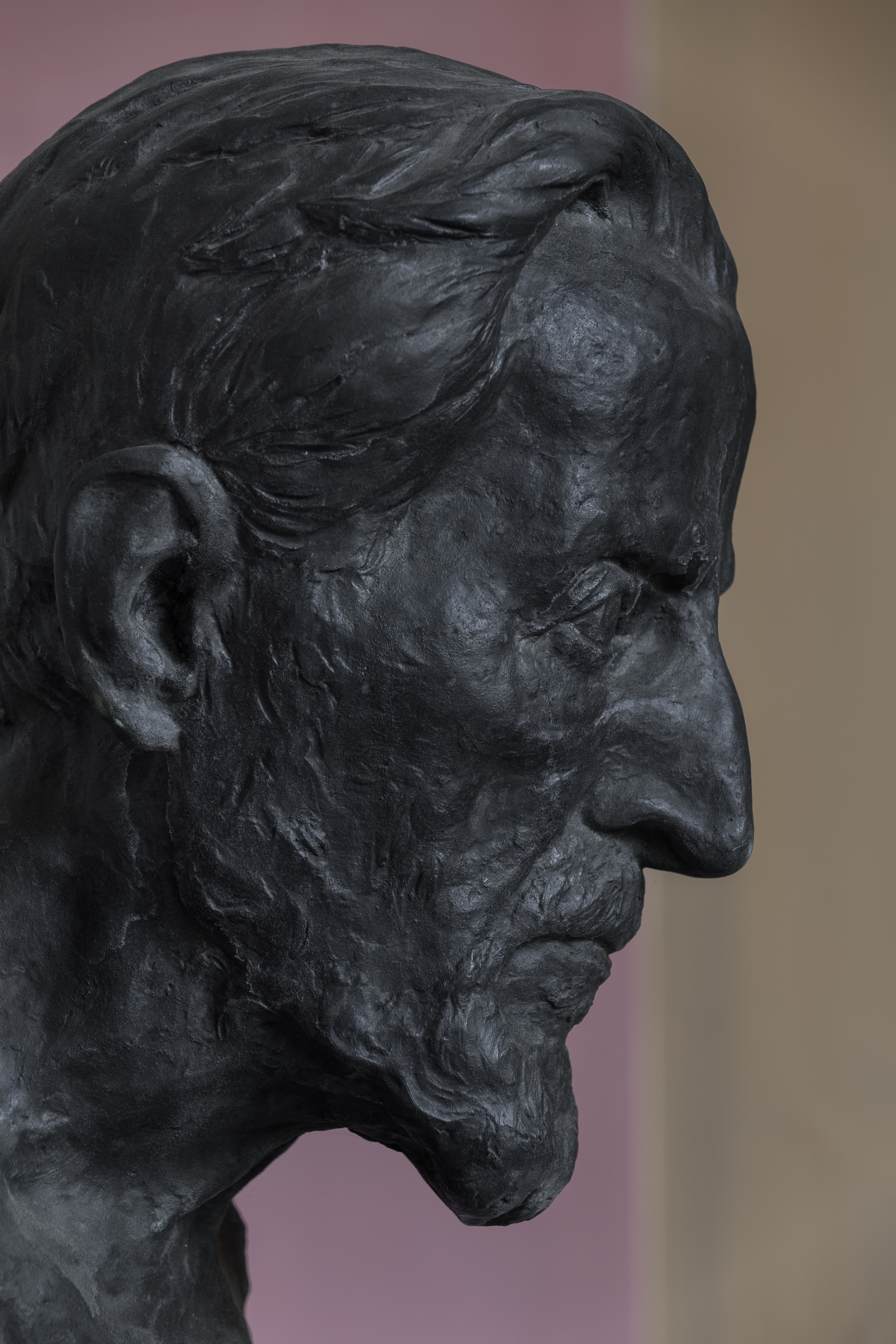
Hans Horst Meyer, bust in the Arkadenhof of the University of Vienna

Hans Horst Meyer (17 March 1853 – 6 October 1939) was a German pharmacologist. He studied medicine and did research in pharmacology. The Meyer-Overton hypothesis on the mode of action on general anaesthetics is partially named after him. He also discovered the importance of glucuronic acid as a reaction partner for drugs, and the mode of action of tetanus toxin on the body.

== Life ==
Meyer was born in Insterburg in the Province of Prussia (now Chernyakhovsk, Russia). He studied medicine in Königsberg, Leipzig, Berlin and again in Königsberg. After his promotion to Doctor of medicine in Königsberg he worked with Oswald Schmiedeberg, one of the founders of pharmacology as an independent scientific discipline, in Strasbourg. In 1881 he was appointed to the Chair of Pharmacology in Dorpat (now Tartu, Estonia). Also in 1881, he married Doris née Boehm. Together they had three sons, Kurt Heinrich (1883–1952), Arthur Woldemar (1885–1933) and Friedrich Horst (1889–1894).

Between 1884 and 1904 Meyer occupied the Chair of Pharmacology in Marburg where he worked with Emil Adolf von Behring and Otto Loewi, winner of the 1936 Nobel Prize in Physiology or Medicine. In 1904, Meyer moved to Vienna, and Loewi joined him until he was appointed to the Chair of Pharmacology in Graz. Ernst Peter Pick joined the department in 1911. Pick would later succeed Meyer as Chair. During Meyer's time in Vienna, he worked with three scientists who would eventually win the Nobel Prize in Physiology or Medicine. George Hoyt Whipple won the award in 1934, Corneille Heymans won in 1938 and Carl Ferdinand Cori was awarded the Nobel Prize in 1947. Meyer retired in 1924 and remained in Vienna.

Meyer's later life was impacted by National Socialism. His second son, Arthur was a well-known surgeon in Berlin who was one of the first to successfully carry out surgical embolectomy in massive pulmonary embolism. On 14 November 1933 Arthur shot his wife and then committed suicide. Arthur's wife was Jewish, and allegations were made that he was also Jewish. In 1938, Meyer and Pick were expelled from the German Academy of Sciences Leopoldina as "non-Aryan". After this, Pick emigrated to the United States. Meyer died the same year in Vienna.

Meyer’s eldest son, Kurt Heinrich Meyer, was research director of BASF from 1920 to 1929 later served as a professor of chemistry of the University of Geneva. He supervised the doctoral thesis of Edmond Henri Fischer, who with Edwin Gerhard Krebs won the Nobel prize in physiology and medicine in 1992. Horst Meyer (physicist), the son of Meyer's second son Arthur, was adopted by Kurt after Arthur's death. He grew up in Geneva, where he studied Physics at the University and in 1959 joined the Physics faculty of Duke University, in Durham, NC, where he became Emeritus professor in 2005.

== Scientific achievements ==
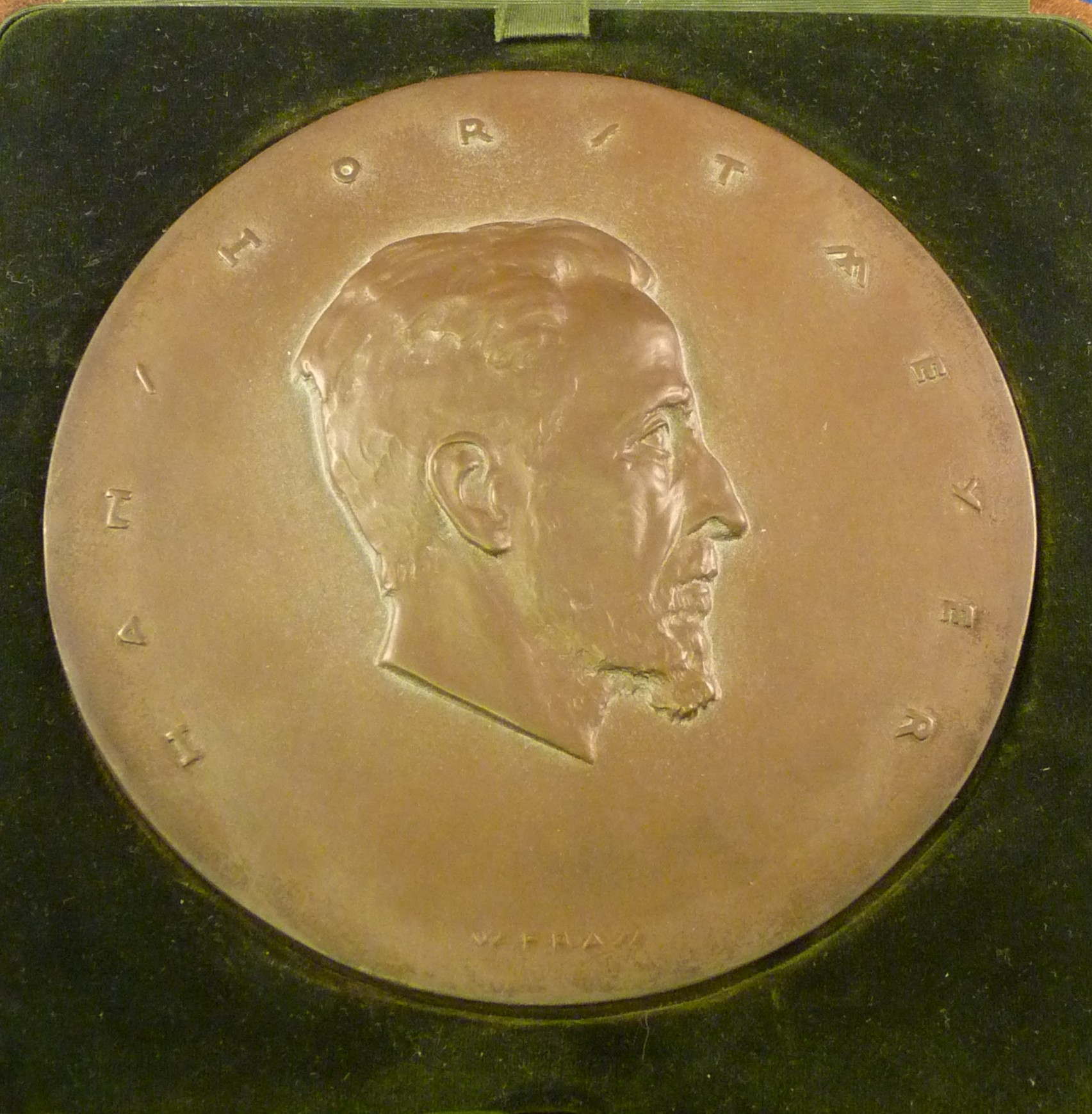
Hans Horst Meyer Medal awarded by the Vienna Academy of Sciences

Meyer is best remembered for three discoveries. With Schmiedeberg, he discovered glucuronic acid as the most important reaction partner of drugs (in his case, a metabolite of camphor). He also discovered a relationship between the lipophilicity of general anaesthetics and their potency. Meyer concluded that lipophilicity was the essential factor in the effectiveness of an anaesthetic. These findings were summarized in three papers in Archiv für experimentelle Pathologie und Pharmakologie by Meyer and his coworker Fritz Baum, published in 1899. A year later, Charles Ernest Overton (1865–1933) independently came to the same conclusion. This correlation became known as the Meyer-Overton hypothesis. It has been called the most influential correlation in anaesthesia Meyer also discovered that tetanus toxin acts on the central nervous system and is transported there from the periphery via the motor neurons. This explains why the incubation time always takes several hours, and why therapy with antibodies is of limited value.

Meyer and Rudolf Gottlieb wrote a major German pharmacology textbook that was published in nine editions between 1910 and 1936. he also played an important role in the development and implementation of drug regulation in Austria.

== Awards ==
Meyer received many awards and honors over the course of his career, at many different levels. One of the highest honors he received was the founding of the 'Hans Meyer Medal' on his 70th birthday by the Vienna Academy of Sciences. This medal was to be awarded every fifth year for the most important pharmacological contribution published in German. A volume of the Archiv für experimentelle Pathologie und Pharmakologie, edited by Bernhard Naunyn, was also dedicated to Meyer on his 70th birthday. These items, personal papers, and other memorabilia relating to Meyer's career are in the possession of the Collections at Duke University's Rubenstein Library.
