= PRAC2 =

Protein-coding gene in humans

Identifiers
- Aliases: PRAC2, C17orf93, HOXB-AS5, HOXB13-AS1, NCRNA00253, prostate cancer susceptibility candidate 2, PRAC2 small nuclear protein, HOXBAS5
- External IDs: OMIM: 610787; GeneCards: PRAC2

Gene location (Human)
Chr.	Chromosome 17 (human)
Band	17q21.32	Start	48,723,185 bp
Band	17q21.32	End	48,724,758 bp
RNA expression pattern
Bgee	Human / Mouse (ortholog); Top expressed in: gonad; testicle; rectum; prostate; mucosa of transverse colon; vagina; right testis; left testis; placenta; epithelium of colon / n/a; More reference expression data
BioGPS	n/a
Orthologs
Databases	NCBI: entry; OMA: entry
Species	Human	Mouse
Entrez	360205	n/a
Ensembl	ENSG00000229637	n/a
UniProt	D3DTV9	n/a
RefSeq (mRNA)	NM_001282275; NM_001282276	n/a
RefSeq (protein)	NP_001269204; NP_001269205	n/a
Location (UCSC)	Chr 17: 48.72 – 48.72 Mb	n/a
PubMed search		n/a
- Wikidata
View/Edit Human

Protein PRAC2 is a protein that in humans is encoded by the gene PRAC2 (prostate, rectum, and colon 2). It was identified in a human prostate cDNA library, and (in humans) is highly expressed in the prostate and testis, and to a lesser extent in the rectum and distal colon. Not much has been reported about the function of this proteins.
