= Kurt Heinrich Meyer =

German chemist (1883–1952)

Kurt Heinrich Meyer or Kurt Otto Hans Meyer (29 September 1883 – 14 April 1952) was a German chemist.

== Life and work ==
Born in Tartu, Estonia, Meyer was the son of the pharmacologist Hans Horst Meyer. He was a student from 1892 until 1901 in the “Gymnasium Philippinum” in Marburg, Germany. This was followed at first by studies in medicine, later in chemistry at Marburg University (where Theodor Zincke was the professor), and at Leipzig University, the University of Freiburg, the University of London, and at the Ludwig-Maximilians-Universität München. In Leipzig, Meyer obtained his PhD in 1907 with the dissertation “Untersuchungen über Halochromie” (Research on Halochromie) under the direction of Arthur Hantzsch. Afterwards, following the advice of his father, he travelled to England to complement his education and worked for several months in the laboratory of Ernest Rutherford. After his return to Germany in 1891, he obtained the highest academic degree, the Habilitation, working under the direction of Adolf von Baeyer in Munich on the determination of the equilibrium of the Keto-enol tautomerism of ethyl acetoacetate. This was done through the determination of the Enol content in Keto-Enol-tautomerism equilibria via titration of bromine (“Ueber die Keto-Enol Tautomerie”). The Meyer-Schuster rearrangement and the "Meyer’s Back Titration" method bear his name.

In World War I, beginning in 1914, Meyer served as an officer in the artillery, however he was called in 1917 to carry out warfare research work in the Kaiser Wilhelm Society Institute in Berlin under the direction of Fritz Haber. After the end of the war he worked at the Ludwig-Maximilians-Universität München under the direction of Richard Willstätter. After a few more years at the university, he moved in 1921 to the BASF AG in Ludwigshafen, where he was appointed as director of the Research laboratories. Here his interests were concerned with high Polymer chemistry. He worked in collaboration with Herman Francis Mark, whom he had brought into his institute. In 1929, he relinquished this position of director and in 1931 became Professor of organic and inorganic Chemistry at the University of Geneva in Switzerland. There, one of his long-time collaborators was A.J.A. van der Wijk. Among his many students and collaborators was Edmond H. Fischer, who obtained in 1992 the Nobel Prize in Physiology or Medicine he shared with Edwin G. Krebs. Fischer's doctoral research was involved with the isolation and purification of the Alpha-amylase, where he confirmed its nature as that of a protein, and not of a polysaccharide.

Meyer died in 1952 on a vacation in Menton, France. His son, Horst Meyer, studied at the universities of Geneva and Zürich and since 1959 has been a professor of physics – emeritus since 2005 - at Duke University in Durham, North Carolina.

== Bibliography ==
W. V. Farrar has written a biography of Meyer and provided information on the complete list of Meyer's monographs and publications. K. H. Meyer and H. F. Mark produced the first complete textbook of the polymer chemistry This textbook was updated in collaboration with Antoine J. A. van der Wijk

Sixteen articles about the alpha-amylase, the doctoral research topic of Edmond H. Fischer, were published of which one is cited here Biographical references are to articles by Claus Priesner, by Heinrich Hopff, and by Edmond H. Fischer and Alfred Piguet
