= Horst Meyer =

Horst Meyer may refer to:

- Horst Meyer (physicist) (1926–2016), Swiss physicist
- Horst Meyer (rower) (1941–2020), German rower
