= Ligation (molecular biology) =

Technique for joining nucleic acid fragments

A sticky end ligation

Ligation is the joining of two nucleotides, or two nucleic acid fragments, into a single polymeric chain through the action of an enzyme known as a ligase. The reaction involves the formation of a phosphodiester bond between the 3'-hydroxyl terminus of one nucleotide and the 5'-phosphoryl terminus of another nucleotide, which results in the two nucleotides being linked consecutively on a single strand. Ligation works in fundamentally the same way for both DNA and RNA. A cofactor is generally involved in the reaction, usually ATP or NAD^{+}. Eukaryotic ligases belong to the ATP type, while the NAD+ type are found in bacteria (e.g. E. coli).

Ligation occurs naturally as part of numerous cellular processes, including DNA replication, transcription, splicing, and recombination, and is also an essential laboratory procedure in molecular cloning, whereby DNA fragments are joined to create recombinant DNA molecules (such as when a foreign DNA fragment is inserted into a plasmid). The discovery of DNA ligase dates back to 1967 and was an important event in the field of molecular biology. Ligation in the laboratory is normally performed using T4 DNA ligase. It is broadly used in vitro due to its capability of joining sticky-ended fragments as well as blunt-ended fragments. However, procedures for ligation without the use of standard DNA ligase are also popular. Human DNA ligase abnormalities have been linked to pathological disorders characterized by immunodeficiency, radiation sensitivity, and developmental problems.

== Ligation reaction ==
The mechanism of the ligation reaction was first elucidated in the laboratory of I. Robert Lehman. Two fragments of DNA may be joined by DNA ligase which catalyzes the formation of a phosphodiester bond between the 3'-hydroxyl group (-OH) at one end of a strand of DNA and the 5'-phosphate group (-PO4) of another. In animals and bacteriophages, ATP is used as the energy source for the ligation, while in bacteria, NAD^{+} is used.

The DNA ligase first reacts with ATP or NAD^{+}, forming a ligase-AMP intermediate with the AMP linked to the ε-amino group of lysine in the active site of the ligase via a phosphoramide bond. This adenylyl group is then transferred to the phosphate group at the 5' end of a DNA chain, forming a DNA-adenylate complex. Finally, a phosphodiester bond between the two DNA ends is formed via the nucleophilic attack of the 3'-hydroxyl at the end of a DNA strand on the activated 5′-phosphoryl group of another.

A nick in the DNA (i.e. a break in one strand of a double-stranded DNA) can be repaired very efficiently by the ligase. However, a complicating feature of ligation conducted presents itself when ligating two separate DNA ends as the two ends need to come together before the ligation reaction can proceed. In the ligation reactions conducted in a laboratory, the ligation of DNA with sticky or cohesive ends, the protruding strands of DNA may be annealed together already, therefore it is a relatively efficient process as it is equivalent to repairing two nicks in the DNA. However, in the ligation of blunt-ends, which lack protruding ends for the DNA to anneal together, the process is dependent on random collision for the ends to align together before they can be ligated, and is consequently a much less efficient process. The DNA ligase from E. coli cannot ligate blunt-ended DNA except under conditions of molecular crowding, and it is therefore not normally used for ligation in the laboratory. Instead the DNA ligase from phage T4 is used as it can ligate blunt-ended DNA as well as single-stranded DNA.

== Factors affecting ligation ==
In the laboratory, factors that affect an enzyme-mediated chemical reaction would naturally affect a ligation reaction, these include the concentration of enzyme and the reactants, the temperature of reaction and the length of time of incubation. Ligation is complicated by the fact that the reaction can involve both inter- and intra-molecular reactions, but the desired ligation products in many ligation reactions (e.g. ligating a DNA fragment into a vector) needed first to be inter-molecular, i.e. between two different DNA molecules, followed by an intra-molecular reaction to seal and circularize the molecule. For efficient ligation, an additional annealing step is also necessary.

The three steps to form a new phosphodiester bond during ligation are: enzyme adenylylation, adenylyl transfer to DNA, and nick sealing. Mg(2+) is a cofactor for catalysis, therefore at high concentration of Mg(2+) the ligation efficiency is high. If the concentration of Mg(2+) is limited, the nick- sealing is the rate- limiting reaction of the process, and adenylylated DNA intermediate stays in the solution. Such adenylylation of the enzyme restrains the rebinding to the adenylylated DNA intermediate comparison of an Achilles' heel of LIG1, and represents a risk if they are not fixed.

=== DNA concentration ===
The concentration of DNA can affect the rate of ligation, and whether the ligation is an inter-molecular or intra-molecular reaction. Ligation involves joining up the ends of a DNA with other ends, however, each DNA fragment has two ends, and if the ends are compatible, a DNA molecule can circularize by joining its own ends. At high DNA concentration, there is a greater chance of one end of a DNA molecule meeting the end of another DNA, thereby forming intermolecular ligation. At a lower DNA concentration, the chance that one end of a DNA molecule would meet the other end of the same molecule increases, therefore intramolecular reaction that circularizes the DNA is more likely. The transformation efficiency of linear DNA is also much lower than circular DNA, and for the DNA to circularize, the DNA concentration should not be too high. As a general rule, the total DNA concentration should be less than 10 μg/ml.

The relative concentration of the DNA fragments, their length, as well as buffer conditions are also factors that can affect whether intermolecular or intramolecular reactions are favored.

The concentration of DNA can be artificially increased by adding condensing agents such as cobalt hexamine and biogenic polyamines such as spermidine, or by using crowding agents such as polyethylene glycol (PEG) which also increase the effective concentration of enzymes. Note however that additives such as cobalt hexamine can produce exclusively intermolecular reaction, resulting in linear concatemers rather than the circular DNA more suitable for transformation of plasmid DNA, and is therefore undesirable for plasmid ligation. If it is necessary to use additives in plasmid ligation, the use of PEG is preferable as it can promote intramolecular as well as intermolecular ligation.

=== Ligase concentration ===
As is usual for an enzyme, the higher the ligase concentration, the faster is the rate of ligation. Blunt-end ligation is much less efficient than sticky end ligation, so a higher concentration of ligase is used in blunt-end ligations. High DNA ligase concentration may be used in conjunction with PEG for a faster ligation, and they are the components often found in commercial kits designed for rapid ligation.

=== Temperature ===
Two issues are involved when considering the temperature of a ligation reaction. First, the optimum temperature for DNA ligase activity which is 37^{°}C, and second, the melting temperature (T_{m}) of the DNA ends to be ligated. The melting temperature is dependent on length and base composition of the DNA overhang—the greater the number of G and C, the higher the T_{m} since there are three hydrogen bonds formed between G-C base pair compared to two for A-T base pair—with some contribution from the stacking of the bases between fragments. For the ligation reaction to proceed efficiently, the ends should be stably annealed, and in ligation experiments, the T_{m} of the DNA ends is generally much lower than 37^{°}C. The optimal temperature for ligating cohesive ends is therefore a compromise between the best temperature for DNA ligase activity and the T_{m} where the ends can associate. However, different restriction enzymes generates different ends, and the base composition of the ends produced by these enzymes may also differ, the melting temperature and therefore the optimal temperature can vary widely depending on the restriction enzymes used, and the optimum temperature for ligation may be between 4-15^{°}C depending on the ends. Ligations also often involve ligating ends generated from different restriction enzymes in the same reaction mixture, therefore it may not be practical to select optimal temperature for a particular ligation reaction and most protocols simply choose 12-16^{°}C, room temperature, or 4^{°}C. When conducting a ligation at 4^{°}C, it is necessary to increase the time of ligation reaction, for example by leaving the ligation mixture overnight or longer in the fridge.

=== Buffer composition ===
The ionic strength of the buffer used can affect the ligation. The kinds of cations presence can also influence the ligation reaction, for example, excess amount of Na^{+} can cause the DNA to become more rigid and increase the likelihood of intermolecular ligation. At high concentration of monovalent cation (>200 mM) ligation can also be almost completely inhibited. The standard buffer used for ligation is designed to minimize ionic effects.

== Sticky-end ligation ==
Restriction enzymes can generate a wide variety of ends in the DNA they digest, but in cloning experiments most commonly used restriction enzymes generate a 4-base single-stranded overhang called the sticky or cohesive end (exceptions include NdeI which generates a 2-base overhang, and those that generate blunt ends). These sticky ends can anneal to other compatible ends and become ligated in a sticky-end (or cohesive end) ligation. EcoRI for example generates an AATT end, and since A and T have lower melting temperature than C and G, its melting temperature T_{m} is low at around 6^{°}C. For most restriction enzymes, the overhangs generated have a T_{m} that is around 15^{°}C. For practical purposes, sticky end ligations are performed at 12-16^{°}C, or at room temperature, or alternatively at 4^{°}C for a longer period.

For the insertion of a DNA fragment into a plasmid vector, it is preferable to use two different restriction enzymes to digest the DNA so that different ends are generated. The two different ends can prevent the religation of the vector without any insert, and it also allows the fragment to be inserted in a directional manner.

When it is not possible to use two different sites, then the vector DNA may need to be dephosphorylated to avoid a high background of recircularized vector DNA with no insert. Without a phosphate group at the ends the vector cannot ligate to itself, but can be ligated to an insert with a phosphate group. Dephosphorylation is commonly done using calf-intestinal alkaline phosphatase (CIAP) which removes the phosphate group from the 5′ end of digested DNA, but note that CIAP is not easy to inactivate and can interfere with ligation without an additional step to remove the CIAP, thereby resulting in failure of ligation. CIAP should not be used in excessive amount and should only be used when necessary. Shrimp alkaline phosphatase (SAP) or Antarctic phosphatase (AP) are suitable alternative as they can be easily inactivated.

== Blunt-end ligation ==
Blunt end ligation does not involve base-pairing of the protruding ends, so any blunt end may be ligated to another blunt end. Blunt ends may be generated by restriction enzymes such as SmaI and EcoRV. A major advantage of blunt-end cloning is that the desired insert does not require any restriction sites in its sequence as blunt-ends are usually generated in a PCR, and the PCR generated blunt-ended DNA fragment may then be ligated into a blunt-ended vector generated from restriction digest.

Blunt-end ligation, however, is much less efficient than sticky end ligation, typically the reaction is 100X slower than sticky-end ligation. Since blunt-end does not have protruding ends, the ligation reaction depends on random collisions between the blunt-ends and is consequently much less efficient. To compensate for the lower efficiency, the concentration of ligase used is higher than sticky end ligation (10x or more). The concentration of DNA used in blunt-end ligation is also higher to increase the likelihood of collisions between ends, and longer incubation time may also be used for blunt-end ligations.

If both ends needed to be ligated into a vector are blunt-ended, then the vector needs to be dephosphorylated to minimize self-ligation. This may be done using CIAP, but caution in its use is necessary as noted previously. Since the vector has been dephosphorylated, and ligation requires the presence of a 5'-phosphate, the insert must be phosphorylated. Blunt-ended PCR product normally lacks a 5'-phosphate, therefore it needs to be phosphorylated by treatment with T4 polynucleotide kinase.

Blunt-end ligation is also reversibly inhibited by high concentration of ATP.

PCR usually generates blunt-ended PCR products, but note that PCR using Taq polymerase can add an extra adenine (A) to the 3' end of the PCR product. This property may be exploited in TA cloning where the ends of the PCR product can anneal to the T end of a vector. TA ligation is therefore a form of sticky end ligation. Blunt-ended vectors may be turned into vector for TA ligation with dideoxythymidine triphosphate (ddTTP) using terminal transferase.

== General guidelines ==
For the cloning of an insert into a circular plasmid:

- The total DNA concentration used should be less than 10 μg/ml as the plasmid needs to recircularize.
- The molar ratio of insert to vector is usually used at around 3:1. Very high ratio may produce multiple inserts. The ratio may be adjusted depending on the size of the insert, and other ratios may be used, such as 1:1.

== Trouble-shooting ==
Sometimes ligation fail to produce the desired ligated products, and some of the possible reasons may be:

- Damaged DNA – Over-exposure to UV radiation during preparation of DNA for ligation can damage the DNA and significantly reduce transformation efficiency. A higher-wavelength UV radiation (365 nm) which cause less damage to DNA should be used if it is necessary work for work on the DNA on a UV transilluminator for an extended period of time. Addition of cytidine or guanosine to the electrophoresis buffer at 1 mM concentration however may protect the DNA from damage.
- Incorrect usage of CIAP or its inefficient inactivation or removal.
- Excessive amount of DNA used.
- Incomplete DNA digest – The vector DNA that is incompletely digested will give rise to a high background, and this may be checked by doing a ligation without insert as a control. Insert that is not completely digested will also not ligate properly and circularize. When digesting a PCR product, make sure that sufficient extra bases have been added to the 5'-ends of the oligonucleotides used for PCR as many restriction enzymes require a minimum number of extra basepairs for efficient digest. The information on the minimum basepair required is available from restriction enzyme suppliers such as in the catalog of New England Biolabs.
- Incomplete ligation – Blunt-ends DNA (e.g. SmaI) and some sticky-ends DNA (e.g. NdeI) that have low-melting temperature require more ligase and longer incubation time.
- Protein expressed from ligated gene insert is toxic to cells.
- Homologous sequence in insert to sequence in plasmid DNA resulting in deletion.
- High concentration of EDTA or salts that acts as an inhibitors.

== Other methods of DNA ligation ==
A number of commercially available DNA cloning kits use other methods of ligation that do not require the use of the usual DNA ligases. These methods allow cloning to be done much more rapidly, as well as allowing for simpler transfer of cloned DNA insert to different vectors. These methods however require the use of specially designed vectors and components, and may lack flexibility.

=== Topoisomerase-mediated ligation ===
Topoisomerase can be used instead of ligase for ligation, and the cloning may be done more rapidly without the need for restriction digest of the vector or insert. In this TOPO cloning method a linearized vector is activated by attaching topoisomerase I to its ends, and this "TOPO-activated" vector may then accept a PCR product by ligating to both of the 5' ends of the PCR product, the topoisomerase is released and a circular vector is formed in the process.

=== Homologous recombination ===
Another method of cloning without the use of ligase is by DNA recombination, for example as used in the Gateway cloning system. The gene, once cloned into the cloning vector (called entry clone in this method), may be conveniently introduced into a variety of expression vectors by recombination.

== Examples and application of DNA ligases ==
Different types of ligases found in the studied organisms. For instance, Nicotinamide adenine dinucleotide (NAD+)-dependent ligase was found and isolated from bacterial organism, known as E. coli in second third of 20th century. Since then, this model has been widely used to study that DNA ligase family. Moreover, it is found in all bacteria. Examples of genes present in E. coli are LigA, which has essential functions affecting bacterial growth, and LigB.

In mammals, including human 3 genes, namely Lig1, Lig3, Lig4 were identified. All eukaryotes contain multiple types of DNA ligases encoded by Lig genes. The smallest known eukaryotic ligase is Chlorella virus DNA ligase (ChVLig). It contains only 298 amino acids. When ChVLig is the only source of ligase in the cell, it can continue to support mitotic development, and nonhomologous end joining in budding yeasts. DNA Ligase I (Lig1) is accountable for Okazaki Fragments ligation. It is consist of 919 amino acids. In a complex process of DNA replication, DNA Ligase I recruited to replications machinery by protein interactions. Lig1 plays role in cell division in plants and yeasts. Knockout of the Lig1 gene is lethal in yeasts and some plants sprouts. Nevertheless, studies of mouse embryogenesis have shown that until the middle of the growth process embryo developing without DNA ligase I.

Enzymatic ligation has been used in various studies related to DNA nanostructures and lead to increase of efficiency and stability. One of the methods is sealing of covalent DNA bond, namely phosphodiester bond and nicks. Reconstruction of those structures performed with assistance of ligation. For instance, T4 DNA ligase serve as a catalyst for sealing of a nick between 3 prime and 5 prime ends of DNA to make up strong phosphodiester bond. Ligated structures have higher thermal stability values. T4 DNA ligase has many valuable properties such as already mentioned catalytic, but it is also responsible for sealing of the gaps between DNA strands, nick-closing activity, repair of the DNA damage, etc.

In nanostructures architecture, molecular biology researches - ssDNA is an important application model. T4 DNA ligase used to cyclize short ssDNA fragments, but process is complicated by formation of secondary structures. On the other hand, Taq DNA ligase is a thermostable enzyme which can be applied at higher temperatures (45, 55 and 65 °C respectively). Since at these temperature range secondary structures less stable it is enhance cyclization efficiency of oligonucleotides. The kinetic, biological, and other parameters of nanostructures are influenced by presence of the secondary structures in DNA rings. However, Taq DNA ligation occur only when two complementary DNA strands are perfectly paired and have no gaps in between.

Analysis of ligases activities, mutations, deficiencies widely used in drug design and biological researches to investigate diseases, pathologies developments and related rare acquired or inherited syndromes (e.g. DNA ligase IV syndrome).

The ligation procedure is prevalent in molecular biology cloning techniques, and it has been applied to define and characterize specific nucleotide sequences in the genome using Ligase Chain Reaction (LCR) or Polymerase Chain Reaction (PCR)-based amplification of ligated probes.

== Analysis ==
Ligation may also serve as a DNA analysis method. Some techniques employ rolling circle amplification. The most notable of these is described by Smolina et al., 2007 & Smolina et al., 2008 using fluorescence in situ hybridization and peptide nucleic acids. They developed and employed this technique for analyses of bacterial chromosomes.

== See also ==
- Ligation-independent cloning
- Nuclease
