= Paul Brakefield =

British evolutionary biologist

Paul Martin Brakefield FRS (born 31 May 1952) is a British evolutionary biologist who was Professor of Zoology at the University of Cambridge, where he is also was Fellow of Trinity College and between 2010 and 2019 was director of the Museum of Zoology. He previously held the Chair in Evolutionary Biology at Leiden University in the Netherlands, and was President of the Linnean Society of London from 2015 to 2018. He is best known for his research on butterfly eyespots.

== Career ==
Brakefield was born on 31 May 1952 in Woking. In 1987 Brakefield became a Professor of Evolutionary Biology at Leiden University. Concurrently Brakefield was president of the European Society for Evolutionary Biology between 2005 and 2007. In 2010 he left Leiden after serving as a professor for 23 years to become director of the Cambridge University Museum of Zoology. In 2011, Brakefield was elected a Fellow of Trinity College, Cambridge. On 22 May 2015 Brakefield became President of the Linnean Society of London, serving until May 2018. In 2019 Brakefield retired. He was succeeded as director of the museum by Rebecca Kilner.

== Research ==
Brakefield works mostly with butterflies and insects. Amongst other topics his research focuses on eyespots on butterflies, especially Bicyclus anynana. The butterfly species Bicyclus brakefieldi is named after him.

== Honours and awards ==
Brakefield was elected Fellow of the Royal Society in 2010. He was elected a foreign member of the Royal Netherlands Academy of Arts and Sciences in 2011. Brakefield was elected a member of the European Molecular Biology Organization in 2014. In 2018 Brakefield was elected an honorary fellow of the Royal Entomological Society.
