= List of fellows of the Royal Society elected in 2010 =

Fellows (FRS) and foreign members (ForMemRS) of the Royal Society elected in 2010

== Fellows ==
1. Gabriel Aeppli
2. Ian Affleck
3. Paul Brakefield
4. Andrea Brand
5. Eleanor Campbell
6. Philip Candelas
7. Peter Cawley
8. Nicola Susan Clayton
9. John William Connor
10. Russell Cowburn
11. Gideon Davies
12. Donald Dawson
13. Raymond Dolan
14. Hugh Durrant-Whyte
15. Lyndon Evans
16. Richard Evershed
17. Georg Gottlob
18. Ben Green
19. Robert Charles Griffiths
20. Roger Hardie
21. Michael Hastings
22. Andrew Hattersley
23. Craig Jon Hawker
24. Ronald Thomas Hay
25. Ian David Hickson
26. Peter Horton
27. Jeremy Hutson
28. Victoria Kaspi
29. Lewis Edward Kay
30. Ondrej Krivanek
31. Angus Iain Lamond
32. Alan Lehmann
33. Malcolm McCulloch
34. Robin MacGregor Murray
35. Robin Noel Perutz
36. Max Pettini
37. Thomas Platts-Mills
38. Wolf Reik
39. Loren Rieseberg
40. Peter William Jack Rigby
41. Ezio Rizzardo
42. Elizabeth Simpson
43. Alan Edward Smith
44. Eric Wolff

== Foreign members ==
1. Pascale Cossart
2. Carl Djerassi
3. Ludwig Dmitrievich Faddeev
4. Edmond Henri Fischer
5. Michael Goodchild
6. John Bannister Goodenough
7. Detlef Weigel
8. Kurt Wuthrich

== Honorary member ==
- Melvyn Bragg
