= Bicyclus brakefieldi =

Scientific classification
- Kingdom: Animalia
- Phylum: Arthropoda
- Clade: Pancrustacea
- Class: Insecta
- Order: Lepidoptera
- Family: Nymphalidae
- Genus: Bicyclus
- Species: B. brakefieldi

Binomial name
- Bicyclus brakefieldi Brattstrom, 2012

Species of butterfly

Bicyclus brakefieldi is a butterfly in the family Nymphalidae. It is found in the Democratic Republic of the Congo. The species is named after Paul Brakefield.
