= NdeI =

Restriction enzyme

NdeI is an endonuclease isolated from Neisseria denitrificans.

In molecular biology, it is commonly used as a restriction enzyme.

== Recognition sequence ==
Recognition sequence of NdeI:

5'CATATG
3'GTATAC

The ends generated by NdeI digest:

5'---CA     TATG---3'
3'---GTAT     AC---5'

== Use in molecular biology ==
NdeI is a specific Type II restriction enzyme that cuts open specific target sequences, unlike exonucleases. This enzyme is used in gene cloning to cut open reading frames in the plasmid of certain bacteria such as E. coli and insert a foreign gene, such as the gfpuv gene that codes for bio fluorescence of the jelly fish Aequorea victoria.

NdeI is useful in generating heterologous DNA construct because it contains the start codon ATG. It therefore can be used in some expression vectors, such as those in the pET series of vectors, for the ligation of the start of a gene when making an expression construct. However, NdeI generates only a two-base overhang and therefore has a lower melting temperature than other restriction enzymes that generate a four-base overhang. It has a lower ligation efficiency, since ligation is affected by the ability of the ends to anneal and a two-base overhang has a significantly lower melting temperature compared to a 4-base overhang. Ligation of NdeI-generated ends is therefore best performed with higher ligase concentration with a longer ligation time, whether at room temperature, 14-16^{°}C, or at 4^{°}C.
