= Robert Behringer =

American physicist

Robert P. Behringer (October 26, 1948 – July 10, 2018) was an American physicist based at Duke University, whose research first dealt with critical phenomena and transport properties in fluid helium, such as Rayleigh–Bénard convection, and since 1986 was involved with granular material, where his most notable achievements were in the development of the technique of photoelasticity to study spatio-temporal fluctuations. This enabled him to extract vector forces from images of photo-elastic disks, which are models for granular materials. His research demonstrated the strongly fluctuating nature of granular flows. Another aspect of his research involved the concept of jamming in granular materials.

A native of Baltimore and the son of Frederick and Elizabeth Behringer, he obtained his BSc in Physics at Duke University in 1970, his PhD in Physics in 1975 also at Duke University, with Horst Meyer as his mentor, and was a research associate at Bell Labs under the direction of Guenter Ahlers from 1975 -77. A faculty position at Wesleyan University was the next step and in 1982 he was appointed by Duke University, where he became a James B. Duke Professor in 1994.

Behringer died on July 10, 2018, aged 69.

== Awards and honors ==
- Alfred P. Sloan Foundation Fellow (1981-1985)
- Fellow, American Physical Society (1993–present)
- Fellow of the American Association for the Advancement of Science (1999–present)
- James B. Duke Professor (1994–present)
- Visiting Scientist, Ecole Supérieure de Physique et Chimie Industrielles, Paris, 1997.
- Joliot Curie Chair, Ecole Supérieure de Physique et Chimie Industrielles, Paris, 2010.
- Visiting Scientist, C.E.A. Saclay, France, Fall 2010.
- Chair Line, American Physical Society Topical Group on the Physics of Climate, American Physical Society, 2012
- Jesse W. Beams Award of the Physical Society, South-Eastern Section, 2013
