= Meyer–Schuster rearrangement =

Chemical reaction

Named after	Kurt Heinrich Meyer; Kurt Schuster
Reaction type	Rearrangement reaction

Identifiers
RSC ontology ID	RXNO:0000476

The Meyer–Schuster rearrangement is the chemical reaction described as an acid-catalyzed rearrangement of secondary and tertiary propargyl alcohols to α,β-unsaturated ketones if the alkyne group is internal and α,β-unsaturated aldehydes if the alkyne group is terminal.

The Meyer-Schuster rearrangement

== Mechanism ==
Meyer-Schuster Rearrangement

The reaction proceeds by three major steps: (1) the rapid protonation of oxygen, (2) the slow, rate-determining step comprising the 1,3-shift of the protonated hydroxy group, and (3) the keto-enol tautomerism followed by rapid deprotonation. Formation of the unsaturated carbonyl compound is irreversible. Solvent is important and solvent caging is proposed to stabilize the transition state.

== Rupe rearrangement ==
The reaction of tertiary alcohols containing an α-acetylenic group does not produce the expected aldehydes, but rather α,β-unsaturated methyl ketones via an enyne intermediate. This alternate reaction is called the Rupe reaction, and competes with the Meyer–Schuster rearrangement in the case of tertiary alcohols.

The Rupe rearrangement

Mechanism of the Rupe rearrangement

== Use of catalysts ==
The traditional Meyer–Schuster rearrangement is induced by strong acids, which introduces competition with the Rupe reaction if the alcohol is tertiary. Milder conditions are possible with transition metal-based and Lewis acid catalysts (for example, Ru- and Ag-based catalysts). Microwave-radiation with InCl_{3} catalyst to give excellent yields with short reaction times and good stereoselectivity.

Cadierno et al.'s microwave-assisted catalysis

== Use in organic synthesis ==
The Meyer–Schuster rearrangement has been used in several syntheses. ω-Alkynyl-ω-carbinol lactams convert into enamides using catalytic PTSA α,β-Uunsaturated thioesters have been prepared from γ-sulfur substituted propargyl alcohols. 3-Alkynyl-3-hydroxyl-1H-isoindoles rearrange under mildly acidic conditions to the α,β-unsaturated carbonyl compounds. The synthesis of a part of paclitaxel exploits this rearrangement for a diastereomerically-selective route to the E-alkene.

Part of the synthesis of taxol using the Meyer-Schuster rearrangement

The step shown above had a 70% yield (91% when the byproduct was converted to the Meyer-Schuster product in another step). The authors used the Meyer–Schuster rearrangement because they wanted to convert a hindered ketone to an alkene without destroying the rest of their molecule.

== History ==
The reaction is named after Kurt Meyer and Kurt Schuster. Reviews have been published by Swaminathan and Narayan,

== Applications ==
- Used in Butaclamol synthesis.
