= TA cloning =

TA cloning (also known as rapid cloning or T cloning) is a subcloning technique that avoids the use of restriction enzymes and is easier and quicker than traditional subcloning. The technique relies on the ability of adenine (A) and thymine (T) (complementary basepairs) on different DNA fragments to hybridize and, in the presence of ligase, become ligated together. PCR products are usually amplified using Taq DNA polymerase which preferentially adds an adenine to the 3' end of the product. Such PCR amplified inserts are cloned into linearized vectors that have complementary 3' thymine overhangs.

== Procedure ==
Diagram of TA Cloning.

=== Creating the insert ===
The insert is created by PCR using Taq polymerase. This polymerase lacks 3' to 5' proofreading activity and, with a high probability, adds a single, 3'-adenine overhang to each end of the PCR product. It is best if the PCR primers have guanines at the 5' end as this maximizes probability of Taq DNA polymerase adding the terminal adenosine overhang. Thermostable polymerases containing extensive 3´ to 5´ exonuclease activity should not be used as they do not leave the 3´ adenine-overhangs.

=== Creating the vector ===
The target vector is linearized and cut with a blunt-end restriction enzyme. This vector is then tailed with dideoxythymidine triphosphate (ddTTP) using terminal transferase. It is important to use ddTTP to ensure the addition of only one T residue. This tailing leaves the vector with a single 3'-overhanging thymine residue on each blunt end. Manufacturers commonly sell TA Cloning "kits" with a wide range of prepared vectors that have already been linearized and tagged with an overhanging thymine.

== Benefits and drawbacks ==
Given that there is no need for restriction enzymes other than for generating the linearized vector, the procedure is much simpler and faster than traditional subcloning. There is also no need to add restriction sites when designing primers and thus shorter primers can be used saving time and money. In addition, in instances where there are no viable restriction sites that can be used for traditional cloning, TA cloning is often used as an alternative. The major downside of TA cloning is that directional cloning is not possible, so the gene has a 50% chance of getting cloned in the reverse direction.

== See also ==
- TOPO cloning
