= CDNA library =

Type of DNA library

A cDNA library is a combination of cloned cDNA (complementary DNA) fragments inserted into a collection of host cells, which constitute some portion of the transcriptome of the organism and are stored as a "library." cDNA is produced from fully transcribed mRNA found in the nucleus and therefore contains only the expressed genes of an organism. Similarly, tissue-specific cDNA libraries can be produced. In eukaryotic cells, the mature mRNA is already spliced; hence, the cDNA produced lacks introns and can be readily expressed in a bacterial cell. While information in cDNA libraries is a powerful and useful tool since gene products are easily identified, the libraries lack information about enhancers, introns, and other regulatory elements found in a genomic DNA library.

== cDNA Library Construction ==
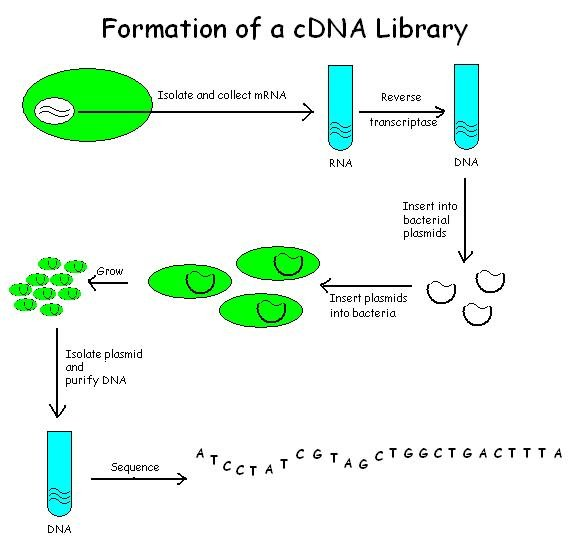
Formation of a cDNA library.

cDNA is created from a mature mRNA from a eukaryotic cell with the use of reverse transcriptase. In eukaryotes, a poly-(A) tail (consisting of a long sequence of adenine nucleotides) distinguishes mRNA from tRNA and rRNA and can therefore be used as a primer site for reverse transcription. This has the problem that not all transcripts, such as those for the histone, encode a poly-A tail.

=== mRNA extraction ===
Firstly, mRNA template needs to be isolated for the creation of cDNA libraries. Since mRNA only contains exons, the integrity of the isolated mRNA should be considered so that the protein encoded can still be produced. Isolated mRNA should range from 500 bp to 8 kb. Several methods exist for purifying RNA such as trizol extraction and column purification. Column purification can be done using oligomeric dT nucleotide coated resins, and features of mRNA such as having a poly-A tail can be exploited where only mRNA sequences containing said feature will bind. The desired mRNA bound to the column is then eluted.

=== cDNA construction ===
Once mRNA is purified, an oligo-dT primer (a short sequence of deoxy-thymidine nucleotides) is bound to the poly-A tail of the RNA. The primer is required to initiate DNA synthesis by the enzyme reverse transcriptase. This results in the creation of RNA-DNA hybrids where a single strand of complementary DNA is bound to a strand of mRNA. To remove the mRNA, the RNAse H enzyme is used to cleave the backbone of the mRNA and generate free 3'-OH groups, which is important for the replacement of mRNA with DNA. DNA polymerase I is then added, the cleaved RNA acts as a primer the DNA polymerase I can identify and initiate replacement of RNA nucleotides with those of DNA. This is provided by the sscDNA itself by coiling on itself at the 3' end, generating a hairpin loop. The polymerase extends the 3'-OH end, and later the loop at 3' end is opened by the scissoring action of S_{1} nuclease. Restriction endonucleases and DNA ligase are then used to clone the sequences into bacterial plasmids.

The cloned bacteria are then selected, commonly through the use of antibiotic selection. Once selected, stocks of the bacteria are created which can later be grown and sequenced to compile the cDNA library.

== cDNA Library uses ==
cDNA libraries are commonly used when reproducing eukaryotic genomes, as the amount of information is reduced to remove the large numbers of non-coding regions from the library. cDNA libraries are used to express eukaryotic genes in prokaryotes. Prokaryotes do not have introns in their DNA and therefore do not possess any enzymes that can cut them out during the transcription process. cDNA does not have introns and therefore can be expressed in prokaryotic cells. cDNA libraries are most useful in reverse genetics, where the additional genomic information is of less use. Additionally, cDNA libraries are frequently used in functional cloning to identify genes based on the encoded protein's function. When studying eukaryotic DNA, expression libraries are constructed using complementary DNA (cDNA) to help ensure the insert is truly a gene.

=== cDNA Library vs. Genomic DNA Library ===
cDNA library lacks the non-coding and regulatory elements found in genomic DNA. Genomic DNA libraries provide more detailed information about the organism, but are more resource-intensive to generate and keep.

== Cloning of cDNA ==
cDNA molecules can be cloned by using restriction site linkers. Linkers are short, double-stranded pieces of DNA (oligodeoxyribonucleotide) about 8 to 12 nucleotide pairs long that include a restriction endonuclease cleavage site e.g. BamHI. Both the cDNA and the linker have blunt ends, which can be ligated together using a high concentration of T4 DNA ligase. Sticky ends are then produced in the cDNA molecule by cleaving the cDNA ends (which now have linkers with an incorporated site) with the appropriate endonuclease. A cloning vector (plasmid) is then also cleaved with the appropriate endonuclease. Following "sticky end" ligation of the insert into the vector the resulting recombinant DNA molecule is transferred into E. coli host cell for cloning.

== See also ==
- Functional cloning
