= Calf-intestinal alkaline phosphatase =

Identifiers
- Organism: Bos taurus
- Symbol: ALPI
- UniProt: P19111
Search for
- Structures: Swiss-model
- Domains: InterPro

Calf-intestinal alkaline phosphatase

Identifiers
- EC no.: 3.1.3.1

Databases
- IntEnz: IntEnz view
- BRENDA: BRENDA entry
- ExPASy: NiceZyme view
- KEGG: KEGG entry
- MetaCyc: metabolic pathway
- PRIAM: profile
- PDB structures: RCSB PDB PDBe PDBsum
- Gene Ontology: AmiGO / QuickGO
Search
- PMC: articles
- PubMed: articles
- NCBI: proteins

Calf-intestinal alkaline phosphatase (CIAP/CIP) is a type of alkaline phosphatase that catalyzes the removal of phosphate groups from the 5' end of DNA strands and phosphomonoesters from RNA. This enzyme is frequently used in DNA sub-cloning, as DNA fragments that lack the 5' phosphate groups cannot ligate. This prevents recircularization of the linearized DNA vector, and improves the yield of the vector containing the appropriate insert.

== Applications ==
Calf-intestinal alkaline phosphatase can serve as an effective tool for removing uranium from groundwater, and from soil that can pose major health risks. Furthermore, the toxicity of lipopolysaccharide (LPS) was mitigated by calf-intestinal alkaline phosphatase in mice and piglets, which indicates that it could be a promising new therapeutic agent for treating diseases associated with LPS.
