= Gateway Technology =

Molecular biology method for cloning DNA fragments

The Gateway cloning method is a method of molecular cloning invented and commercialized by Invitrogen since the late 1990s, which makes use of the integration and excision recombination reactions that take place when bacteriophage lambda infects bacteria. This technology provides a fast and highly efficient way to transport DNA sequences into multi-vector systems for functional analysis and protein expression using Gateway att sites and two proprietary enzyme mixes called BP Clonase and LR Clonase. In vivo, these recombination reactions are facilitated by the recombination of attachment sites from the lambda/phage chromosome (attP) and the bacteria (attB). As a result of recombination between the attP and attB sites, the phage integrates into the bacterial genome flanked by two new recombination sites (attLeft and attRight). The removal of the phage from the bacterial chromosome and the regeneration of attP and attB sites can both result from the attL and attR sites recombining under specific circumstances.

DNA sequences of interest are added to modified versions of these special Gateway Att sites. Two enzyme reactions take place, BP Clonase and LR Clonase. The BP Clonase occurs between the attB sites surrounding the insert and the attP sites of the donor vector. This reaction is catalyzed by the BP Clonase enzyme mixture and produces the entry clone containing the DNA of interest flanked by attL domains. As a byproduct of the reaction, the lethal ccdB gene is excised from the donor vector. The LR Clonase occurs between the attL regions of the generated entry clone and the attR regions of the target vector and is catalyzed by the LR Clonase enzyme mix. As a result, an expression clone with DNA of interest flanked by attB regions is produced. As in the BP reaction, a DNA sequence containing the ccdB gene is cut from the target vector.

Large archives of Gateway Entry clones, containing the vast majority of human, mouse, and rat ORFs (open reading frames) have been cloned from human cDNA libraries or chemically synthesized to support the research community using NIH (National Institutes of Health) funding (e.g. Mammalian Gene Collection, http://mgc.nci.nih.gov/). The availability of these gene cassettes in a standard Gateway cloning plasmid helps researchers quickly transfer these cassettes into plasmids that facilitate the analysis of gene function. Gateway cloning does take more time for initial set-up, and is more expensive than traditional restriction enzyme and ligase-based cloning methods, but it saves time and offers simpler and highly efficient cloning for downstream applications.

The technology has been widely adopted by the life science research community especially for applications that require the transfer of thousands of DNA fragments into one type of plasmid (e.g., one containing a CMV promoter for protein expression in mammalian cells), or for the transfer of one DNA fragment into many different types of plasmids (e.g., for bacterial, insect, and mammalian protein expression).

== Basic procedure ==
The first step in Gateway cloning is the preparation of a Gateway Entry clone. There are a few different ways to make entry clone.

1. Gateway attB1 and attB2 sequences are added to the 5' and 3' end of a gene fragment, respectively, using gene-specific PCR primers and PCR amplification. The PCR amplification products are then mixed with a proprietary mixture of plasmids called Gateway "Donor vectors" (Invitrogen terminology) and proprietary "BP Clonase" enzymes. The enzyme mix catalyzes the recombination and insertion of the PCR product containing the attB sequence into the attP recombination sites in the Gateway Donor vector. When the cassette is part of the target plasmid, it is referred to as an "Entry clone" in Gateway nomenclature and the recombination sequences are referred to as Gateway "attL" type.
2. A short end containing attL is added using the TOPO method, a technique in which DNA fragments are cloned into specific vectors without the need for DNA ligases.
3. The desired DNA sequence can be cloned into a multicloning site containing attL using restriction enzyme.

The second step in Gateway cloning is the preparation of a Gateway Destination vector. It is important to choose the target vector that best suits your target when preparing the expression clone. The gene cassette in the Gateway Entry clone can then be simply and efficiently transferred into any Gateway Destination vector (Invitrogen nomenclature for any Gateway plasmid that contains Gateway “attR” recombination sequences and elements such as promoters and epitope tags, but not ORFs) using the proprietary enzyme mix, “LR Clonase”. Thousands of Gateway Destination plasmids have been made and are freely shared amongst researchers across the world. Gateway Destination vectors are similar to classical expression vectors containing multiple cloning sites, before the insertion of a gene of interest, using restriction enzyme digestion and ligation. Gateway Destination vectors are commercially available from Invitrogen, EMD (Novagen) and Covalys.

The third step in Gateway cloning is the preparation of express your gene of interest. Make sure to use sequencing or a restriction digest to check the integrity of your expression clone. Once your construct is working, you can transform or transfect the cells you intend to employ in your investigations.

Since Gateway cloning uses patented recombination sequences, and proprietary enzyme mixes available only from Invitrogen, the technology does not allow researchers to switch vendors and contributes to the lock-in effect of all such patented procedures.

To summarize the different steps involved in Gateway cloning:

- Gateway BP reaction: PCR-product with flanking attB sites (this step can also use other methods of DNA isolation, such as restriction-digestion) + Donor vector containing attP sites + BP clonase => Gateway Entry clone, containing attL sites, flanking gene of interest
- Gateway LR reaction: Entry clone containing attL sites + Destination vector containing attR sites, and promoters and tags + LR clonase => Expression clone containing attB sites, flanking gene of interest, ready for gene expression.

== Advantages ==
- Flexibility: Your DNA sequence of interest can be moved across any expression system in just one recombination step when you create the entry clone with it.
- Speed: Instead of taking two or more days with conventional restriction and ligation cloning, the Gateway approach allows for the creation of the expression construct in just one day. The attB-PCR products can also be immediately cloned into the target vectors by performing the BP and LR reactions in the same tube. There are no procedures for restriction, ligation, or gel purification during the cloning process.
- Multiple fragment cloning: Gateway cloning can be used to simultaneously insert several DNA pieces into numerous vectors in a single tube. To create the necessary expression clone, up to four DNA segments can be cloned into a single Gateway vector in a precise order and orientation in a single tube. The design of the Gateway vectors makes this possible.
- High efficiency: The Gateway Cloning Method uses positive and negative selection markers to increase the chance of successfully cloning a gene. This means that the process is more efficient, meaning it is more likely to produce successful results.
- Universality: All types of DNA fragments can be cloned using PCR techniques. Cloning is available for many different kinds of organisms, from mammals to bacteria.

== See also ==
- Cloning
- Gateway cassette
- Subcloning
