= Horst Meyer (physicist) =

Swiss physicist (1926–2016)

- Born: March 1, 1926; Berlin, Prussia
- Died: August 14, 2016 (aged 90)
- Education: University of Geneva (BSC in Physics, University of Geneva (Ph.D.)
- Known for: Research in Low Temperature Physics
- Awards: Jesse Beams Award (1982); Fritz London Memorial Prize (1993)
- Scientific career
- Fields: Physics
- Workplaces: Duke University
- Doctoral advisor: Klaus Clusius (University of Zurich)
- Doctoral students: Robert Behringer; Robert Coleman Richardson; A. Brooks Harris

Horst Meyer (March 1, 1926 – August 14, 2016) was a Swiss scientist doing research in condensed matter physics.

Meyer was the son of the surgeon Arthur Woldemar Meyer in Berlin and the grandson of the pharmacologist Hans Horst Meyer. After Arthur's sudden death in 1933 he was adopted by the chemist Kurt Heinrich Meyer, the brother of Arthur, and grew up in Switzerland. After graduating from the Collège Jean Calvin in Geneva, he studied physics and physical chemistry at the universities of Geneva and of Zürich, obtaining his PhD in 1953. He was first a postdoctoral associate, later a Nuffield Fellow in the Clarendon Laboratory at the University of Oxford, from 1957 lecturer at Harvard University. In 1959, he was appointed an assistant professor at Duke University (where Fritz London was formerly on the faculty), and where he became in 1984 the Fritz London Professor and finally professor emeritus in 2004. Meyer died from cancer in 2016.

He was visiting professor at the Technical University of Munich (1965), the University of Tokyo and Toyota Technological Institute in Nagoya, and also 1974 and 1975 at the Institut Laue–Langevin in Grenoble. In 1992, he became co-editor of the Journal of Low Temperature Physics, and in 2014 honorary editor. In 1988, he was guest scientist of the Russian Academy of Sciences.

He was involved with experimental low temperature physics. Among the topics he did research upon were magnetic compounds, beta-quinone clathrate compounds, solid and liquid helium, solid hydrogen and deuterium, and various phase transitions such as order-disorder phase transitions in solid hydrogen. His studies also included the normal–superfluid transition in helium-4 and in mixtures of helium-3 and helium-4, and also their liquid–vapor critical point. Furthermore, he did research on the Rayleigh–Bénard convection and its onset in supercritical helium-3. The list of his publications, as well as the list of his former PhD students and collaborators can be found in his weblink.

In 1993, he received the Fritz London Memorial Prize and in 1982 the Jesse Beams Award of the American Physical Society, of which he was a Fellow since 1970. From 1961 until 1965 he was an Alfred P. Sloan Fellow. In 2014, he was awarded the “University Medal” of Duke University. One of his PhD students, Robert Coleman Richardson, shared the 1996 Nobel Prize in Physics with Douglas Osheroff and David Lee for the discovery of superfluidity in helium-3.

In 1953, he married Ruth Mary Hunter (deceased in 2013) and he has one son, Christopher, who is a staff physicist at the National Institute of Standards and Technology (NIST).
