= Edmond H. Fischer =

American-Swiss biochemist (1920–2021)

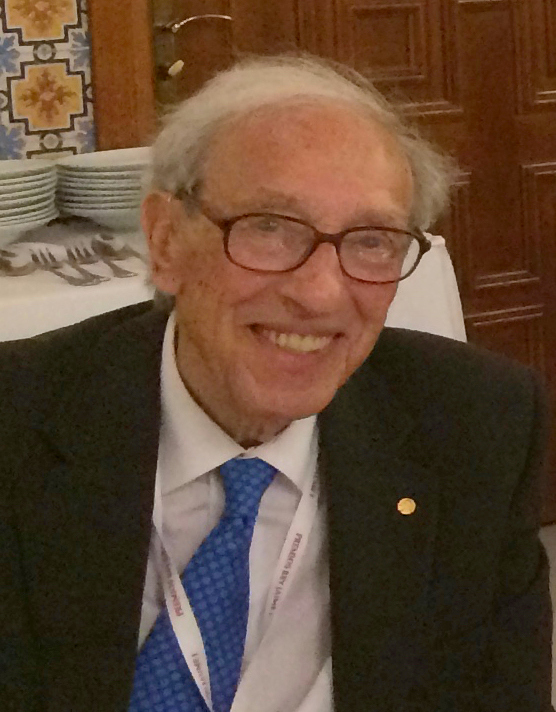
- Fischer in 2016
- Born: Edmond Henri Fischer; April 6, 1920; Shanghai International Settlement, Shanghai, China
- Died: August 27, 2021 (aged 101); Seattle, Washington, U.S.
- Education: University of Geneva
- Known for: Protein phosphorylation
- Spouses: Nelly Gagnaux (died); Beverly Bullock
- Awards: Nobel Prize in Physiology or Medicine (1992)
- Scientific career
- Workplaces: University of Washington
- Thesis: La purification et l'isolement de l'alpha-amylase de pancréas (1947)
- Doctoral advisor: Kurt Heinrich Meyer
- Website: depts.washington.edu/biowww/pages/faculty-Fischer.shtml

Edmond Henri Fischer (April 6, 1920 – August 27, 2021) was a Swiss-American biochemist. He and his collaborator Edwin G. Krebs were awarded the Nobel Prize in Physiology or Medicine in 1992 for describing how reversible phosphorylation works as a switch to activate proteins and regulate various cellular processes. From 2007 until 2014, he was the Honorary President of the World Cultural Council. At the time of his death at age 101 in 2021, he was the oldest living Nobel Prize laureate.

== Early life ==
Fischer was born on April 6, 1920, in the Shanghai International Settlement, China. His mother, Renée Tapernoux, was born in France, and his father, Oscar Fischer, was born in Austria. His father, who was Jewish, practiced as a lawyer in Shanghai before the various consular courts in the city. Fischer's maternal grandfather founded the Courrier de Chine in Shanghai, the first newspaper published in French in China; he also helped to establish L'Ecole Municipale Française in Shanghai, where Fischer attended primary school.

At age seven, Fischer and his two elder brothers, Raoul and George, were sent to the Swiss boarding school La Châtaigneraie, near his mother's hometown in Vevey. He picked up mountain climbing and skiing during his time at the school. At high school he made a pact with a childhood friend, one of them would become a doctor and the other a scientist and then they could cure the ills of the world. While at high school Fischer was admitted to the Geneva Conservatory of Music as a pianist and he also considered becoming a professional musician.

At the completion of high school, Fischer wanted to study microbiology inspired by the works of French chemist and microbiologist Louis Pasteur and partly driven by his father's death from tuberculosis; however, he was advised to study chemistry. He studied at the University of Geneva during World War II, he enjoyed organic chemistry and also studied biology. He completed a PhD in organic chemistry under the supervision of Kurt Heinrich Meyer, who worked on the structure of polysaccharides, and the enzymes needed for their synthesis and breakdown. Fischer worked on α-amylase.

Reversible protein phosphorylation

== Career and research ==
After his PhD, Fischer went to the United States in 1950 for postdoctoral research. He was supposed to take up a position at Caltech, but he was also, unexpectedly, offered a position at the University of Washington in Seattle. Seattle reminded Fischer and his wife of Switzerland so they chose to settle there.

=== Protein phosphorylation/hydrolysis cycle ===
Six months after his arrival in Seattle, Fischer learnt of a fellow biochemist from the same university, Edwin G. Krebs, who was also trying to answer a similar question on where muscles received the energy that they needed to contract. Fischer began collaborating with Krebs, and the duo began their investigations on glycogen phosphorylase, an enzyme that had been discovered by the husband and wife pair of Gerty Cori and Carl Ferdinand Cori who had won the Nobel Prize for the discovery in 1947. Krebs had earlier studied the enzyme in the muscle tissue, while Fischer had studied the enzyme in a potato. The duo realized a discrepancy in that the enzyme in the muscle required an additional chemical to function, while the potato did not require that additional chemical. Krebs and Fischer defined a series of reactions leading to the activation/inactivation of this enzyme as triggered by hormones and calcium, and in the process discovering the cycle of protein phosphorylation and hydrolysis.

Explained simply, the cycle works like this: a protein kinase moves a phosphate group from adenosine triphosphate (ATP) to a protein, converting it to adenosine diphosphate (ADP). The shape and the function of this protein is thus altered enabling it to take part in converting glycogen into glucose which is used for fuel for muscular contractions. When the protein has completed its role a different enzyme, phosphatase, catalyses hydrolysis of the phosphorylated protein, which reverts to its original state. This cycle takes place to control many metabolic processes.

While the importance of the discovery was not fully recognised in 1955, the discovery became core to explaining one of the fundamental mechanisms that cells use to communicate with one another. Phosphorylation determines how a cell grows, divides, differentiates and eventually dies. The reaction also regulates hormones and proliferation of cancerous cells. The regulation of phosphorylation was determined to be key to understanding diseases such as cancer, diabetes, and heart disease. Many modern drugs build on the work done by Fischer and Krebs including attempting to manipulate the process. For the discovery of the cycle of phosphorylation and hydrolysis Fischer and Krebs were awarded the Nobel Prize for Physiology or Medicine in 1992, for explaining how the reaction acted as a switch to activate proteins and regulate various biochemical cellular processes.

Throughout his career, Fischer's research continued to look at the role of similar cycling in a variety of cellular processes.

== Personal life ==
Fischer married his first wife, Nelly Gagnaux, in 1948 and they remained married until her death in 1961. He married Beverly Bullock in 1963 who died in 2006. Fischer played the piano and often performed sonatas by Beethoven and Mozart for his friends. He also held a private pilots license and enjoyed flying.

Fischer died on August 27, 2021, in Seattle, Washington. He was aged 101.

== Awards and honors ==
Fischer won numerous awards including the Nobel Prize in Physiology or Medicine in 1992. He was elected a Foreign Member of the Royal Society (ForMemRS) in 2010. He was awarded the Werner Prize from the Swiss Chemical Society, the Lederle Medical Faculty Award, the Prix Jaubert from the University of Geneva, the Senior Passano Award and the Steven C. Beering Award from Indiana University. He received Doctorates Honoris Causa from the University of Montpellier, France and the University of Basel, Switzerland. He was elected a Fellow of the American Academy of Arts and Sciences in 1972 and a Member of the National Academy of Sciences in 1973. Fischer was a member of the St. George's University-based Windward Islands Research and Education Foundation (WINDREF) Scientific Advisory Board from 1994 to 2021.

== See also ==
- List of Jewish Nobel laureates

Preceded by José Rafael Estrada	Honorary President of the World Cultural Council; November 2007 – November 17, 2014	Succeeded by Colin Blakemore
