= TOPO cloning =

Topoisomerase-based cloning (TOPO cloning) is a molecular biology technique in which DNA fragments are cloned into specific vectors without the requirement for DNA ligases. Taq polymerase has a nontemplate-dependent terminal transferase activity that adds a single deoxyadenosine (A) to the 3'-end of the PCR products. This characteristic is exploited in "sticky end" TOPO TA cloning. For "blunt end" TOPO cloning, the recipient vector does not have overhangs and blunt-ended DNA fragments can be cloned.

== Principle ==
The technique utilizes the inherent biological activity of DNA topoisomerase I. The biological role of topoisomerase is to cleave and rejoin supercoiled DNA ends to facilitate replication. Vaccinia virus topoisomerase I specifically recognize DNA sequence 5´-(C/T)CCTT-3'. During replication, the enzyme digests DNA specifically at this sequence, unwinds the DNA and, re-ligates it again at the 3' phosphate group of the thymidine base.

The vectors in commercially available TOPO kits have been added to the topoisomerase site embedded in a beta-galactosidase cassette allowing blue-white scanning. The vector ends thus self-assemble, resulting in the production of blue colonies that do not need to be selected and sequenced for potential positive clones.

== "Sticky end" TOPO TA cloning ==
TOPO vectors are designed in such a way that they carry this specific sequence 5´-(C/T)CCTT-3' at the two linear ends. The linear vector DNA already has the topoisomerase enzyme covalently attached to both of its strands' free 3' ends. This is then mixed with PCR products. When the free 5' ends of the PCR product strands attach to the topoisomerase 3' end of each vector strand, the strands are covalently linked by the already bound topoisomerase. This reaction proceeds efficiently when this solution is incubated at room temperature with the required salt. Different types of vectors are used for cloning fragments amplified by either Taq or Pfu polymerase as Taq polymerase (unlike Pfu) leaves an extra "A" nucleotide at the 3'end during amplification.

The TA TOPO cloning technique relies on the ability of adenine (A) and thymine (T) (complementary base pairs) on different DNA fragments to hybridize and, in the presence of ligase or topoisomerase, become ligated together. The insert is created by PCR using Taq DNA polymerase, a polymerase that lacks 3' to 5' proofreading activity and with a high probability adds a single, 3'-adenine overhang to each end of the PCR product. It is best if the PCR primers have guanines at the 5' end as this maximizes probability of Taq DNA polymerase adding the terminal adenosine overhang. Thermostable polymerases containing extensive 3´ to 5´ exonuclease activity should not be used as they do not leave the 3´ adenine-overhangs. The target vector is linearized and cut with a blunt-end restriction enzyme. This vector is then tailed with dideoxythymidine triphosphate (ddTTP) using terminal transferase. It is important to use ddTTP to ensure the addition of only one T residue. This tailing leaves the vector with a single 3'-overhanging thymine residue on each blunt end.

== "Blunt end" TOPO cloning ==
Polymerases (such as Phusion) or restriction enzymes that produce blunt ends can also be used for TOPO cloning. Rather than relying on sticky ends, the blunt end TOPO vector has blunt ends where the topoisomerase molecules are bound. Commercial kits, such as the Zero Blunt® Cloning Kit from Invitrogen, are available.
