= Edwin G. Krebs =

American biochemist (1918–2009)

Edwin Gerhard Krebs
- Edwin Gerhard Krebs
- Born: June 6, 1918; Lansing, Iowa, U.S
- Died: December 21, 2009 (aged 91); Seattle, Washington, U.S
- Education: University of Illinois Urbana–Champaign (B.S.), Washington University in St. Louis (M.D.)
- Awards: Louisa Gross Horwitz Prize (1989); Welch Award in Chemistry (1991); Nobel Prize in Physiology or Medicine (1992)
- Scientific career
- Fields: biochemistry
- Workplaces: University of Washington, Seattle; University of California, Davis; Washington University School of Medicine

Edwin Gerhard Krebs (June 6, 1918 – December 21, 2009) was an American biochemist. He received the Albert Lasker Award for Basic Medical Research and the Louisa Gross Horwitz Prize of Columbia University in 1989 together with Alfred Gilman and, together with his collaborator Edmond H. Fischer, was awarded the Nobel Prize in Physiology or Medicine in 1992 for describing how reversible phosphorylation works as a switch to activate proteins and regulate various cellular processes.

== Early life and education ==
Krebs was born in Lansing, Iowa, the third child of William Carl Krebs, a Presbyterian minister, and Louise Helen (Stegeman) Krebs. The family moved frequently due to the nature of his father's work, though they settled in Greenville, Illinois when Krebs was six and remained there until his father's unexpected death in 1933. Louise Krebs decided to move her family to Urbana, Illinois, where Krebs's elder brothers were attending the University of Illinois Urbana–Champaign. Krebs attended Urbana High School, and enrolled at the University of Illinois Urbana–Champaign in 1936. In his fourth year of study Krebs had decided to either pursue a higher degree in organic chemistry or study medicine. Receiving a scholarship to attend Washington University School of Medicine in St. Louis, he chose the latter.

The School of Medicine afforded Krebs the opportunity to train as a physician as well as to gain experience in medical research. Following graduation in 1943, he undertook an 18-month residency at Barnes Hospital in St. Louis and then went on active duty as a medical officer in the Navy. Krebs was discharged from the Navy in 1946 and was unable to immediately return to hospital work; he was advised to study basic science instead. He chose to study biochemistry and was postdoctoral fellow to Carl and Gerty Cori, working on the interaction of protamine with rabbit muscle phosphorylase. At the completion of his two years' study, Krebs decided to continue his career as a biochemist.

== Research work ==
In 1948 Krebs accepted a position as assistant professor of biochemistry at the University of Washington, Seattle. When Edmond H. Fischer arrived at the department in 1953, the pair decided to work on the enzymology of phosphorylase. During the course of their study they were able to observe the mechanism by which interconversion of the two forms of phosphorylase takes place: reversible protein phosphorylation.

Explained simply, in reversible protein phosphorylation a protein kinase takes a phosphate group from adenosine triphosphate (ATP) and attaches it to a specific site on a protein, introducing both extra mass and negative charge at that site. This can alter the protein's shape and turn its function in a biological process up or down, either by changing its activity or its ability to bind to another protein. The protein can be converted back to its original state by a protein phosphatase that removes the phosphate. This cycle controls numerous metabolic processes, and plays a central role in the regulation of cell division, shape, and motility. Derangement of specific protein phosphorylation pathways is important in human disease, including cancer and diabetes. Fischer and Krebs were awarded the Nobel Prize for Physiology or Medicine in 1992 for the discovery of reversible protein phosphorylation.

== Later life and death ==
Krebs's interest in teaching and administration led him to leave the University of Washington to become the founding chairman of the department of biochemistry at the University of California, Davis. In 1977 he returned to the University of Washington as chairman of the department of pharmacology.

Krebs was hearing impaired.

Krebs died on December 21, 2009. His wife, Virginia, died in 2018. He is survived by three children.

== Bibliography ==
- Raju, T N (2000), "The Nobel chronicles. 1992: Edmond H Fischer (b 1920) and Edwin G Krebs (b 1918)", Lancet, vol. 355, no. 9219 (published June 3, 2000), p. 2004, doi:10.1016/S0140-6736(05)72951-2, PMID 10859071, S2CID 54322974
- Krebs, E G (1998), "An accidental biochemist", Annu. Rev. Biochem., vol. 67, pp. xii–xxxii, doi:10.1146/annurev.biochem.67.1.0, PMID 9759479
- Blum, H E (1992), "Nobel prize for medicine, 1992", Dtsch. Med. Wochenschr., vol. 117, no. 50 (published December 11, 1992), pp. 1935–8, doi:10.1055/s-0029-1235415, PMID 1333946
- Walaas, O; Jahnsen, T; Walaas, S I; Hansson, V (1992), "The 1992 Nobel Prize in physiology and medicine", Tidsskr. Nor. Laegeforen., vol. 112, no. 30 (published December 10, 1992), p. 3775, PMID 1485288
- Fredholm, B B (1992), "Two share the Nobel Prize in medicine this year", Läkartidningen, vol. 89, no. 43 (published October 21, 1992), pp. 3555–8, 363–4, PMID 1334180
- Krebs, E G; Fischer, E H (1989), "The phosphorylase b to a converting enzyme of rabbit skeletal muscle. 1956", Biochim. Biophys. Acta, vol. 1000, pp. 302–9, doi:10.1016/s0006-3002(89)80024-1, PMID 2505847
