= Enzyme induction and inhibition =

Enzyme induction is a process in which a molecule (e.g. a drug) induces (i.e. initiates or enhances) the expression of an enzyme.

Enzyme inhibition can refer to

- the inhibition of the expression of the enzyme by another molecule
- interference at the enzyme-level, basically with how the enzyme works. This can be competitive inhibition, uncompetitive inhibition, non-competitive inhibition or partially competitive inhibition.

If the molecule induces enzymes that are responsible for its own metabolism, this is called auto-induction (or auto-inhibition if there is inhibition). These processes are particular forms of gene expression regulation.

These terms are of particular interest to pharmacology, and more specifically to drug metabolism and drug interactions. They also apply to molecular biology.

== History ==
In the late 1950s and early 1960s, the French molecular biologists François Jacob and Jacques Monod became the first to explain enzyme induction, in the context of the lac operon of Escherichia coli. In the absence of lactose, the constitutively expressed lac repressor protein binds to the operator region of the DNA and prevents the transcription of the operon genes. When present, lactose binds to the lac repressor, causing it to separate from the DNA and thereby enabling transcription to occur. Monod and Jacob generated this theory following 15 years of work by them and others (including Joshua Lederberg), partially as an explanation for Monod's observation of diauxie. Previously, Monod had hypothesized that enzymes could physically adapt themselves to new substrates; a series of experiments by him, Jacob, and Arthur Pardee eventually demonstrated this to be incorrect and led them to the modern theory, for which he and Jacob shared the 1965 Nobel Prize in Physiology or Medicine (together with André Lwoff).

- Aryl hydrocarbon receptor

== Potency ==
Index inducer or just inducer predictably induce metabolism via a given pathway and are commonly used in prospective clinical drug-drug interaction studies.

Strong, moderate, and weak inducers are drugs that decreases the AUC of sensitive index substrates of a given metabolic pathway by ≥80%, ≥50% to <80%, and ≥20% to <50%, respectively.
