= Pht01 =

pHT01 is a plasmid used as a cloning vector for expressing proteins in Bacillus subtilis. It is 7,956 base pairs in length. pHT01 carries Pgrac, an artificial, strong, IPTG-inducible promoter consisting of the Bacillus subtilis groE promoter, a lac operator, and the gsiB ribosome binding site. It was first found on plasmid pNDH33. The plasmid also carries replication regions from the pMTLBs72. The plasmid also carries genes to confer resistance to ampicillin and chloramphenicol.

Plasmid pHT01 is generally stable in both B. subtilis and Escherichia coli, and can be used for protein expression in these host strains. pNDH33/pHT01 have been used to produce up to 16% of total protein output in B. subtilis. Pgrac100 is an improved version of Pgrac, which can produce up to 30% of total cellular proteins in B. subtilis.
