= Diauxic growth =

Type of cellular growth

Diauxic growth, diauxie or diphasic growth is any cell growth characterized by cellular growth in two phases. Diauxic growth, meaning double growth, is caused by the presence of two substrates (usually sugars) in a culture growth media, when the microbial cells are capable of faster growth on one of these substrates. The faster-growth supporting substrate is consumed first, which leads to rapid growth, followed by a lag phase. During the lag phase the cellular machinery used to metabolize the second (slower-growth supporting) substrate is activated and subsequently the second substrate is metabolized.

This can also occur when the bacterium in a closed batch culture consumes most of its nutrients and is entering the stationary phase when new nutrients are suddenly added to the growth media. The bacterium enters a lag phase where it tries to ingest the food. Once the food starts being utilized, it enters a new log phase showing a second peak on the growth curve.

== Growth phases ==
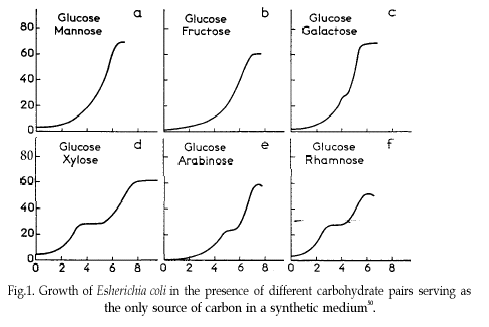
Monod's original results on Diauxie. Time in hours is plotted on the horizontal axis. Optical density (equivalent to cell concentration) is plotted on the vertical axis.

Jacques Monod discovered diauxic growth in 1941 during his experiments with Escherichia coli and Bacillus subtilis. While growing these bacteria on various combination of sugars during his doctoral thesis research, Monod observed that often two distinct growth phases are clearly visible in batch culture, as seen in Figure 1.

During the first phase, cells preferentially metabolize the sugar on which it can grow faster (often glucose but not always). Only after the first sugar has been exhausted do the cells switch to the second. At the time of the "diauxic shift", there is often a lag period during which cells produce the enzymes needed to metabolize the second sugar.

Monod continued his work on the underlying mechanism for his observations on diauxic growth and proposed the lac operon model of gene expression, which led to a Nobel prize.

Diauxie occurs because organisms use operons or multiple sets of genes to control differently the expression of enzymes needed to metabolize the different nutrients or sugars they encounter. If an organism allocates its energy and other resources (e.g. amino acids) to synthesize enzymes needed to metabolize a sugar that can only support a slower growth rate and not use all or most of its available resources to synthesize the enzymes that metabolize a different sugar providing a faster growth rate, such an organism will be at a reproductive disadvantage compared to those that choose to grow on the faster growth supporting sugar. Through evolution, organisms have developed the ability to regulate their genetic control mechanisms so as to only express those genes resulting in the fastest growth rate. For example, when grown in the presence of both glucose and maltose, Lactococcus lactis will produce enzymes to metabolize glucose first, altering its gene expression to use maltose only after the supply of glucose has been exhausted.

== Aerobic fermentation ==
In the case of the baker's or brewer's yeast Saccharomyces cerevisiae growing on glucose with plenty of aeration, the diauxic growth pattern is commonly observed in batch culture. During the first growth phase, when there is plenty of glucose and oxygen available, the yeast cells prefer glucose fermentation to aerobic respiration, in a phenomenon known as aerobic fermentation. Although aerobic respiration may seem a more energetically-efficient pathway (higher cell mass yield per glucose consumed) to grow on glucose, fermentation is the faster pathway for the yeast cells to growth (i.e. higher growth rate) and hence preferred. Contrary to the more commonly invoked Pasteur effect, this phenomenon is closer to the Warburg effect observed in faster growing tumors.

The intracellular genetic regulatory mechanisms have evolved to enforce this choice, as fermentation provides a faster anabolic growth rate for the yeast cells than the aerobic respiration of glucose, which favors catabolism. After glucose is depleted, the fermentative product ethanol is oxidised in a noticeably slower second growth phase, if oxygen is available.

== Proposed mechanisms ==
In the 1940s, Monod hypothesized that a single enzyme could adapt to metabolize different sugars. It took 15 years of further work to show that this was incorrect. During his work on the lac operon of E. coli, Joshua Lederberg isolated β-galactosidase and found it in greater quantities in colonies grown on lactose compared to other sugars. Melvin Cohn in Monod's lab at the Pasteur Institute then found that β-galactosides induced enzyme activity. The idea of enzyme adaptation was thus replaced with the concept of enzyme induction, in which a molecule induces expression of a gene or operon, often by binding to a repressor protein and preventing it from attaching to the operator.

In the case of the bacterial diauxic shift from glucose to lactose metabolism, a proposed mechanism suggested that glucose initially inhibits the ability of the enzyme adenylate cyclase to synthesize cyclic AMP (cAMP). cAMP, in turn, is required for the catabolite activator protein (CAP) to bind to DNA and activate the transcription of the lac operon, which includes genes necessary for lactose metabolism. The presence of allolactose, a metabolic product of lactose, is sensed through the activity of the lac repressor, which inhibits transcription of the lac operon until lactose is present. Thus, if glucose is present, cAMP levels remain low, so CAP is unable to activate transcription of the lac operon, regardless of the presence or absence of lactose. Upon the exhaustion of the glucose supply, cAMP levels rise, allowing CAP to activate the genes necessary for the metabolism of other food sources, including lactose if it is present.

More recent research however suggests that the cAMP model is not correct in this instance since cAMP levels remain identical under glucose and lactose growth conditions, and a different model has been proposed and it suggests that the lactose-glucose diauxie in E. coli may be caused mainly by inducer exclusion. In this model, glucose transport via the EIIA^{Glc} shuts down lactose permease when glucose is being transported into the cell, so lactose is not transported into cell and used. While the cAMP/CAP mechanism may not play a role in the glucose/lactose diauxie, it is a suggested mechanism for other diauxie.

== Diauxic growth curve ==
A diauxic growth curve refers to the growth curve generated by an organism which has two growth peaks. The theory behind the diauxic growth curve stems from Jacques Monod's Ph.D. research in 1940.

A simple example involves the bacterium Escherichia coli (E. coli), the best understood bacterium. The bacterium is grown on a growth media containing two types of sugars, one of which is faster to metabolize than the other (for example glucose and lactose). First, the bacterium will metabolize all the glucose, and grow at a higher speed. Eventually, when all the glucose has been consumed, the bacterium will begin the process of expressing the genes to metabolize the lactose. This will only occur when all glucose in the media has been consumed. For these reasons, diauxic growth occurs in multiple phases.

The first phase is the fast growth phase, since the bacterium is consuming (in the case of the above example) exclusively glucose, and is capable of rapid growth. The second phase is a lag phase while the genes used in lactose metabolism are expressed and observable cell growth stops. This is followed by another growth phase which is slower than the first because of the use of lactose as the primary energy source. The final stage is the saturation phase. This process can also refer to the positive control of the lac operon.
