= SurE =

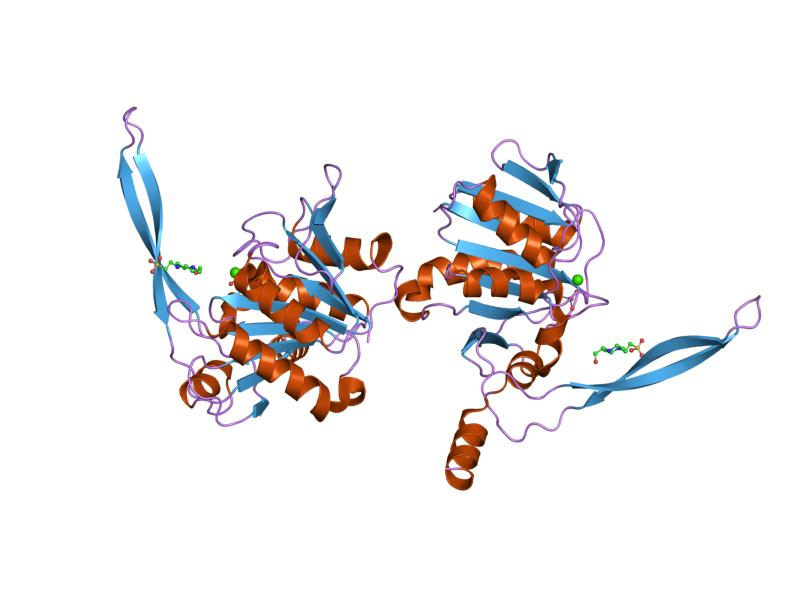
- Crystal structure of SurE protein from T.maritima in complex with tungstate.

Identifiers
- Symbol: SurE
- Pfam: PF01975
- InterPro: IPR002828
- SCOP2: 1j9l / SCOPe / SUPFAM
Available protein structures:
- PDB: IPR002828 PF01975 (ECOD; PDBsum)
- AlphaFold: IPR002828; PF01975

In molecular biology, the protein domain surE refers to survival protein E. It was originally found that cells that did not contain this protein, could not survive in the stationary phase, at above normal temperatures, and in high-salt media. Hence the name, survival protein E. It is a metal ion-dependent phosphatase that is found in bacteria, and eukaryotes. It is an important stress response protein. This domain is found in acid phosphatases (EC), 5'-nucleotidases (EC), 3'-nucleotidases (EC) and exopolyphosphatases (EC).

== Interaction with pcm gene ==
The gene, surE, is part of a bicistronic operon found upstream of the pcm gene. When mutated, their phenotypes, or physical characteristics, are very similar and indicate that both gene products are important for survival under stressful conditions.

== Function ==
The C-terminal domain is important mainly for maintaining the oligomeric state of the protein, SurE. The N-terminal domain is thought to be part of the functional domain. Since the SurE is a phosphatase enzyme it removes a phosphate group from a substance, affecting that substance's role in signal transduction.

== Structure ==
This protein consists of two protein domain. One is a large, globular N-terminal domain and the other is a smaller C-terminal domain.

=== N-terminal domain ===
The N-terminal domain contains a three-layer alpha/beta/alpha sandwich that is homologous with the Rossmann fold (CATH class 3.40.50.170) of which the major feature is a long beta sheet that is composed of nine mostly parallel beta strands. SurEstructural domain has a similar topology to the N-terminal protein domain of the glutaminase/asparaginase family.

=== C-terminal domain ===
The C-terminal domain, has 3 beta strands and two protrusions; one of which is a C-terminal alpha helix, and the second is a beta hairpin.
