= Ortho-Nitrophenyl-β-galactoside =

ortho-Nitrophenyl-β-galactoside
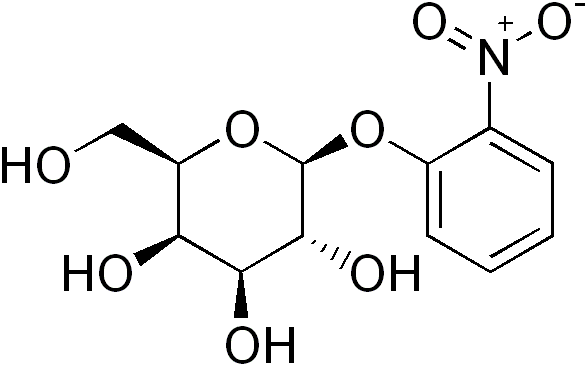

Names
- IUPAC name 2-Nitrophenyl β-D-galactopyranoside
- Systematic IUPAC name (2R,3R,4S,5R,6S)-2-(Hydroxymethyl)-6-(2-nitrophenoxy)oxane-3,4,5-triol
- Other names 2-Nitrophenylgalactoside, Ortho-Nitrophenyl-β-D-Galactopyranoside

Identifiers
CAS Number	369-07-3
3D model (JSmol)	Interactive image
Abbreviations	ONPG
ChEBI	CHEBI:90144
ChEMBL	ChEMBL1229648
ChemSpider	87255
DrugBank	DB01920
ECHA InfoCard	100.006.106
EC Number	206-716-1
MeSH	2-nitrophenylgalactoside
PubChem CID	123646
UNII	8RFX6AT9WP
- InChI: InChI=1S/C12H15NO8/c14-5-8-9(15)10(16)11(17)12(21-8)20-7-4-2-1-3-6(7)13(18)19/h1-4,8-12,14-17H,5H2/t8-,9+,10+,11-,12?/m1/s1 Key: KUWPCJHYPSUOFW-SCWFEDMQSA-N
- SMILES: O=[N+]([O-])C1=CC=CC=C1O[C@@H]2O[C@H](CO)[C@H](O)[C@H](O)[C@H]2O

Properties
Chemical formula	C_{12}H_{15}NO_{8}
Molar mass	301.251 g·mol^{−1}
- Except where otherwise noted, data are given for materials in their standard state (at 25 °C [77 °F], 100 kPa). Infobox references

ortho-Nitrophenyl-β-galactoside (ONPG) is a colorimetric and spectrophotometric substrate for detection of β-galactosidase activity. This compound is normally colorless. However, if β-galactosidase is present, it hydrolyzes the ONPG molecule into galactose and ortho-nitrophenol. The latter compound has a yellow color that can be used to check for enzyme activity by means of a colorimetric assay (at 420 nm wavelength). β-Galactosidase is required for lactose utilization, so the intensity of the color produced can be used as a measure of the enzymatic rate.

Though ONPG mimics lactose and is hydrolyzed by β-galactosidase, it is unable to act as an inducer for the lac operon. Without another lactose analog that can act as an inducer, such as isopropyl β-D-1-thiogalactopyranoside (IPTG), β-galactosidase will not be transcribed and ONPG will not be hydrolyzed.
