= Operon database =

ODB

Content
- Description: operon organizations

Contact
- Research center: Ritsumeikan University
- Laboratory: College of Life Sciences
- Primary citation: Okuda & al. (2011)
- Release date: 2009

Access
- Website: http://operondb.jp/

ODB (Operon DataBase) is a database of conserved operons in sequenced genomes.

== See also ==
- Operon
