= CCDC88C =

Protein-coding gene in humans

Identifiers
- Aliases: CCDC88C, DAPLE, HKRP2, KIAA1509, SCA40, coiled-coil domain containing 88C, HYC1
- External IDs: OMIM: 611204; MGI: 1915589; HomoloGene: 18903; GeneCards: CCDC88C; OMA:CCDC88C - orthologs

Gene location (Human)
| Chr. | Chromosome 14 (human) |
| Band | 14q32.11-q32.12 | Start | 91,271,323 bp |
| Band | 14q32.11-q32.12 | End | 91,417,844 bp |

Gene location (Mouse)
| Chr. | Chromosome 12 (mouse) |
| Band | 12|12 E | Start | 100,877,782 bp |
| Band | 12|12 E | End | 100,995,315 bp |
RNA expression pattern
| Bgee | Human / Mouse (ortholog); Top expressed in: right uterine tube; granulocyte; olfactory zone of nasal mucosa; bronchial epithelial cell; monocyte; lymph node; blood; spleen; ganglionic eminence; bone marrow cell / Top expressed in: granulocyte; spermatocyte; spermatid; thymus; zygote; muscle of thigh; spleen; tail of embryo; lymph node; ventricular zone; More reference expression data |
| BioGPS | n/a |
Gene ontology
| Molecular function | protein self-association; PDZ domain binding; microtubule binding; dynein light intermediate chain binding |
| Cellular component | cytoplasm; centrosome |
| Biological process | regulation of protein phosphorylation; stress-activated protein kinase signaling cascade; protein homooligomerization; Wnt signaling pathway; protein destabilization; cytoskeleton-dependent intracellular transport; cytoplasmic microtubule organization |
Sources:Amigo / QuickGO
Orthologs
| Species | Human | Mouse |
| Entrez | 440193 | 68339 |
| Ensembl | ENSG00000015133 | ENSMUSG00000021182 |
| UniProt | Q9P219 | Q6VGS5 |
| RefSeq (mRNA) | NM_001080414 | NM_026681; NM_001362342 |
| RefSeq (protein) | NP_001073883 | NP_080957; NP_001349271 |
| Location (UCSC) | Chr 14: 91.27 – 91.42 Mb | Chr 12: 100.88 – 101 Mb |
| PubMed search |
- Wikidata
| View/Edit Human | View/Edit Mouse |

Coiled-coil domain containing 88C is a protein that in humans is encoded by the CCDC88C gene.

== Function ==
This gene encodes a ubiquitously expressed coiled-coil domain-containing protein that interacts with the dishevelled protein and is a negative regulator of the Wnt signalling pathway. The protein encoded by this gene has a PDZ domain binding motif in its C-terminus, with which it interacts with the dishevelled protein. Dishevelled is a scaffold protein involved in the regulation of the Wnt signaling pathway.

The Wnt signaling pathway plays an important role in embryonic development, tissue, and cancer progression. Mutations in this gene cause autosomal recessive, primary non-syndromic congenital hydrocephalus, a condition characterized by excessive accumulation of cerebrospinal fluid in the ventricles of the brain (provided by RefSeq, Jan 2013).
