= Regulator gene =

Gene involved in controlling expression of other genes

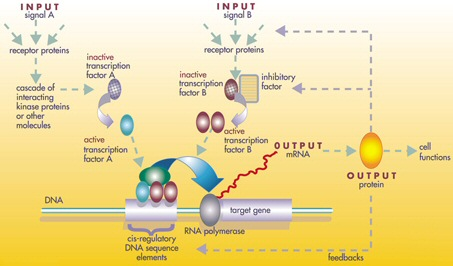
Gene regulatory pathway

In genetics, a regulator gene, regulator, or regulatory gene is a gene involved in controlling the expression of one or more other genes. Regulatory sequences, which encode regulatory genes, are often at the five prime end (5') to the start site of transcription of the gene they regulate. In addition, these sequences can also be found at the three prime end (3') to the transcription start site. In both cases, whether the regulatory sequence occurs before (5') or after (3') the gene it regulates, the sequence is often many kilobases away from the transcription start site. A regulator gene may encode a protein, or it may work at the level of RNA, as in the case of genes encoding microRNAs. An example of a regulator gene is a gene that codes for a repressor protein that inhibits the activity of an operator (a gene which binds repressor proteins thus inhibiting the translation of RNA to protein via RNA polymerase).

In prokaryotes, regulator genes often code for repressor proteins. Repressor proteins bind to operators or promoters, preventing RNA polymerase from transcribing RNA. They are usually constantly expressed so the cell always has a supply of repressor molecules on hand. Inducers cause repressor proteins to change shape or otherwise become unable to bind DNA, allowing RNA polymerase to continue transcription. Regulator genes can be located within an operon, adjacent to it, or far away from it.

Other regulatory genes code for activator proteins. An activator binds to a site on the DNA molecule and causes an increase in transcription of a nearby gene. In prokaryotes, a well-known activator protein is the catabolite activator protein (CAP), involved in positive control of the lac operon.

In the regulation of gene expression, studied in evolutionary developmental biology (evo-devo), both activators and repressors play important roles.

Regulatory genes can also be described as positive or negative regulators, based on the environmental conditions that surround the cell. Positive regulators are regulatory elements that permit RNA polymerase binding to the promoter region, thus allowing transcription to occur. In terms of the lac operon, the positive regulator would be the CRP-cAMP complex that must be bound close to the site of the start of transcription of the lac genes. The binding of this positive regulator allows RNA polymerase to bind successfully to the promoter of the lac gene sequence which advances the transcription of lac genes; lac Z, lac Y, and lac A. Negative regulators are regulatory elements which obstruct the binding of RNA polymerase to the promoter region, thus repressing transcription. In terms of the lac operon, the negative regulator would be the lac repressor which binds to the promoter in the same site that RNA polymerase normally binds. The binding of the lac repressor to RNA polymerase's binding site inhibits the transcription of the lac genes. Only when an inducer is bound to the lac repressor will the binding site be free for RNA polymerase to carry out transcription of the lac genes.

== Gene regulatory elements ==
Promoters reside at the beginning of the gene and serve as the site where the transcription machinery assembles and transcription of the gene begins. Enhancers turn on the promoters at specific locations, times, and levels and can be simply defined as the "promoters of the promoter." Silencers are thought to turn off gene expression at specific time points and locations. Insulators, also called boundary elements, are DNA sequences that create cis-regulatory boundaries that prevent the regulatory elements of one gene from affecting neighboring genes. The general dogma is that these regulatory elements get activated by the binding of transcription factors, proteins that bind to specific DNA sequences, and control mRNA transcription. There could be several transcription factors that need to bind to one regulatory element in order to activate it. In addition, several other proteins, called transcription cofactors, bind to the transcription factors themselves to control transcription.

== Negative regulators ==
Negative regulators act to prevent transcription or translation. Examples such as cFLIP suppress cell death mechanisms leading to pathological disorders like cancer, and thus play a crucial role in drug resistance. Circumvention of such actors is a challenge in cancer therapy. Negative regulators of cell death in cancer include cFLIP, Bcl_{2} family, Survivin, HSP, IAP, NF-κB, Akt, mTOR, and FADD.

== Detection ==
There are several different techniques to detect regulatory genes, but of the many there are a certain few that are used more frequently than others. One of these select few is called ChIP-chip. ChIP-chip is an in vivo technique used to determine genomic binding sites for transcription factors in two component system response regulators. In vitro microarray based assay (DAP-chip) can be used to determine gene targets and functions of two component signal transduction systems. This assay takes advantage of the fact that response regulators can be phosphorylated and thus activated in vitro using small molecule donors like acetyl phosphate.

== Phylogenetic footprinting ==
Phylogenetic footprinting is a technique that utilizes multiple sequence alignments to determine locations of conserved sequences such as regulatory elements. Along with multiple sequence alignments, phylogenetic footprinting also requires statistical rates of conserved and non-conserved sequences. Using the information provided by multiple sequence alignments and statistical rates, one can identify the best conserved motifs in the orthologous regions of interest.
