= C12H16O6 =

The molecular formula C_{12}H_{16}O_{6} (molar mass: 256.25 g/mol, exact mass: 256.0947 u) may refer to:

- Diethylsuccinoylsuccinate
- Phenyl-D-galactopyranoside
