= Galactoside acetyltransferase =

Class of enzymes

Galactoside O-acetyltransferase
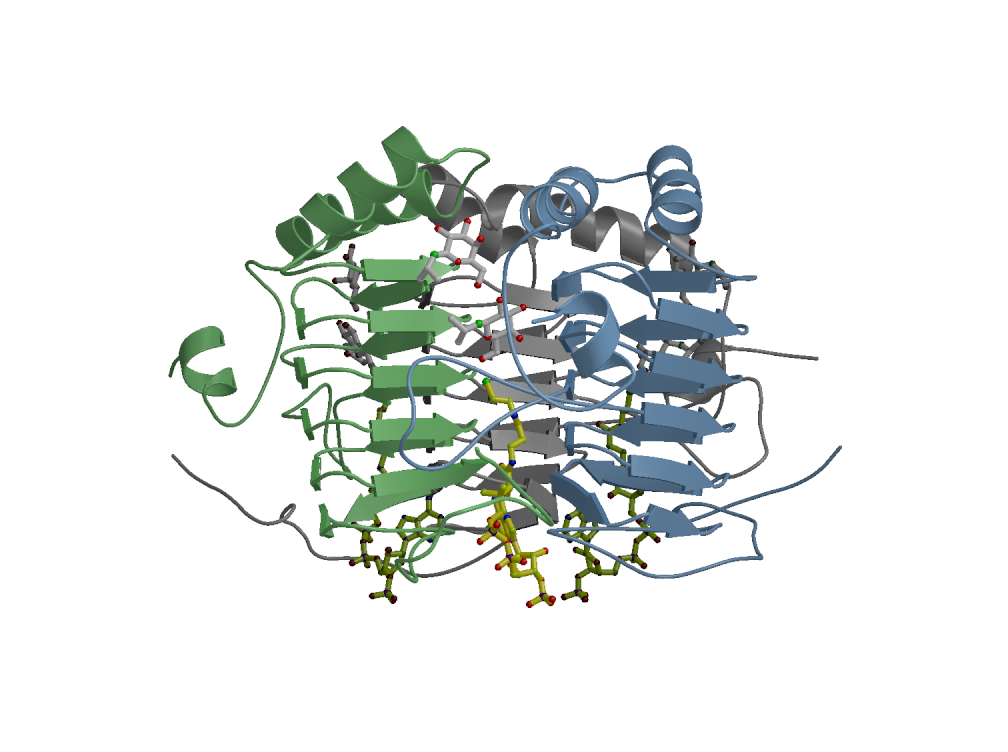
- GAT in complex with CoA and two molecules/active site of IPTG viewed perpendicular to the molecular threefold axis of the enzyme

Identifiers
- EC no.: 2.3.1.18
- CAS no.: 9029-94-1

Databases
- IntEnz: IntEnz view
- BRENDA: BRENDA entry
- ExPASy: NiceZyme view
- KEGG: KEGG entry
- MetaCyc: metabolic pathway
- PRIAM: profile
- PDB structures: RCSB PDB PDBe PDBsum
- Gene Ontology: AmiGO / QuickGO
Search
- PMC: articles
- PubMed: articles
- NCBI: proteins

Thiogalactoside acetyltransferase

Identifiers
- Organism: Escherichia coli
- Symbol: lacA
- Entrez: 945674
- RefSeq (Prot): NP_414876
- UniProt: P07464
Search for
- Structures: Swiss-model
- Domains: InterPro

Galactoside acetyltransferase (also known as Galactoside O-acetyltransferase, thiogalactoside transacetylase, β-galactoside transacetylase and GAT) is an enzyme that transfers an acetyl group from acetyl-CoA to β-galactosides, glucosides and lactosides. It is coded for by the lacA gene of the lac operon in E. coli.

== Reaction ==
It catalyzes the following reaction:

acetyl-CoA + beta-D-galactoside → CoA + 6-acetyl-beta-D-galactoside

The kinetics of the enzyme were delineated in 1995.

== Biological role ==
The enzyme's role in the classical E. coli lac operon remains unclear. However, the enzyme's cellular role may be to detoxify non-metabolizable pyranosides by acetylating them and preventing their reentry into the cell.

== See also ==
- Transacetylase
