= Beta-galactoside permease =

Membrane protein

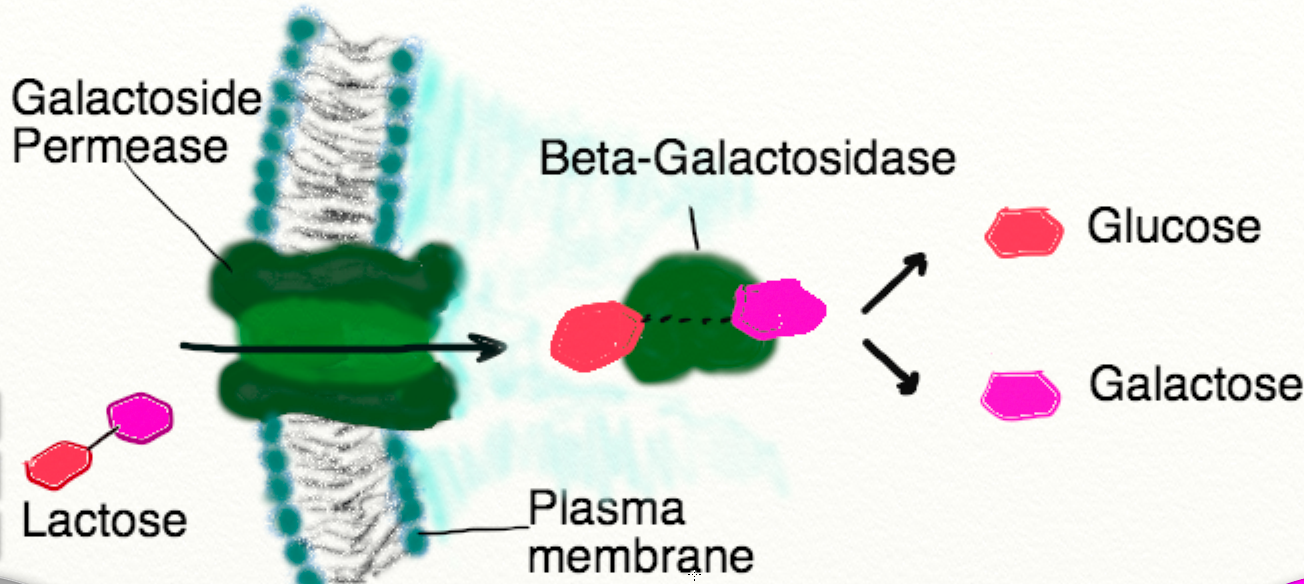
Function of beta-galactoside permease in the membrane of a cell

Galactoside permease is a protein coded by the lacY gene of the lac operon, and is found bound to the membrane of a cell for the purpose of binding galactoside molecules that have been solubilized. The protein is part of a system whose main function is to catalyze the accumulation and transport of lactose and other beta-galactosides across the permeable barrier of a membrane.

== MelB carrier protein and its properties ==
Beta-galactoside permeases can describe any transport proteins that enable a cell to uptake, and thus accumulate, beta-galactosides. One known example of these transport proteins is the melibiose, or melB, carrier protein derived from the melB gene of E. coli. This strain of beta-galactoside permease is known it transport melibiose and other galactosides across the cell membrane using hydrogen, sodium, or lithium ions in cotransport.

== Involvement of the phosphatidic acid cycle ==
Early studies by Hiroshi Nikaido in 1962 suggest a direct relationship between the amount of beta-galactoside permease activity in a cell and the turnover rate of phospholipids in E. coli. In his experiments with gram-positive and gram-negative bacterial cells under varying conditions, the level of P^{32} in phospholipids was found to be increased under conditions of maximal activity in beta-galactoside permease. Insofar, Nikaido concluded that this correlation suggested that phospholipids are involved in the process of transporting beta-galactosides through the cell membrane. However, later research in 1965 by Alvin Tarlov and Eugene Kennedy using carbon tracers reveals increased levels of glycerol and serine, in addition to those of phosphorus, in the presence of increasing levels of beta-galactoside accumulation. The existence of these otherwise inert amino acids in relation to increasing levels of galactosides indicates a far less direct correlation between increasing levels of permease activity with increasing amounts of inorganic phosphate in the cell.

== See also ==
- Lactose permease
