= Jacques Monod =

French biochemist (1910–1976)

Jacques Monod ForMemRS
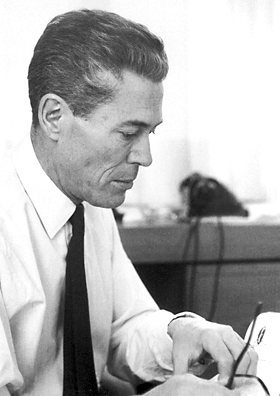
- Born: Jacques Lucien Monod; 9 February 1910; Paris, France
- Died: 31 May 1976 (aged 66); Cannes, France
- Education: University of Paris
- Known for: Lac operon; Allosteric regulation; Model of cooperativity
- Awards: Nobel Prize in Physiology or Medicine (1965); Legion of Honour
- Scientific career
- Fields: Microbiology; Biochemistry; Genetics; Molecular biology
- Workplaces: Pasteur Institute

Jacques Lucien Monod (French: [mɔno]; 9 February 1910 – 31 May 1976) was a French biochemist. He shared the 1965 Nobel Prize in Physiology or Medicine with François Jacob and André Lwoff "for their discoveries concerning genetic control of enzyme and virus synthesis"

Monod and Jacob became famous for their work on the E. coli lac operon, which encodes proteins necessary for the transport and breakdown of the sugar lactose (lac). From their own work and the work of others, they came up with a model for how the levels of some proteins in a cell are controlled. In their model, the manufacture of a set of related proteins, such as the ones encoded within the lac (lactose) operon, is prevented when a repressor protein, encoded by a regulatory gene, binds to its operator, a specific site in the DNA sequence that is close to the genes encoding the proteins. (It is now known that a repressor bound to an operator physically blocks RNA polymerase from binding to the promoter, the site where transcription of the adjacent genes begins.)

Study of the control of expression of genes in the lac operon provided the first example of a system for the regulation of transcription. Monod also suggested the existence of messenger RNA molecules that link the information encoded in DNA and proteins. For these contributions he is widely regarded as one of the founders of molecular biology.

== Career and research ==
As a student at the University of Paris, Monod discovered that the coursework was decades behind the current biological science. He learned from other students a little older than himself, rather than from the faculty. "To George Teissier he owes a preference for quantitative descriptions; André Lwoff initiated him into the potentials of microbiology; to Boris Ephrussi he owes the discovery of physiological genetics, and to Louis Rapkine the concept that only chemical and molecular descriptions could provide a complete interpretation of the function of living organisms."

Before his doctoral work, Monod spent a year in the laboratory of Thomas Hunt Morgan at the California Institute of Technology working on Drosophila genetics. This was a true revelation for him and probably influenced him on developing a genetic conception of biochemistry and metabolism.

Monod's interest in the lac operon originated from his doctoral dissertation, which explored the growth of bacteria on mixtures of sugars and documented the sequential utilization of two or more sugars. The work was conducted at the University of Paris, with André Lwoff of the Pasteur Institute having provided important advice. Monod coined the term diauxie to denote the frequent observations of two distinct growth phases of bacteria grown on two sugars. He theorized on the growth of bacterial cultures and promoted the chemostat theory as a powerful continuous culture system to investigate bacterial physiology. In this work he developed the Monod equation for quantifying bacterial growth.

Monod joined the Pasteur Institute in 1943 and Jacob in 1949. The experimental system ultimately used by Jacob and Monod was a common bacterium, E. coli, but the basic regulatory concept (described in the Lac operon article) that was discovered by Jacob and Monod is fundamental to cellular regulation for all organisms. The key idea is that E. coli does not waste energy making such enzymes if there is no need to metabolize lactose, such as when other sugars like glucose are available. The type of regulation is called negative gene regulation, as the operon is inactivated by a protein complex that is removed in the presence of lactose (regulatory induction).

With Jean-Pierre Changeux and François Jacob, Monod proposed a theory of allosteric transitions to explain how conformational effects could allow enzyme effectors that are structurally quite different from the enzyme's substrates and products to activate or inhibit the reaction: binding at an allosteric site of the enzyme remote from the active site could bring about a change at the active site. He made an important contribution to enzymology when he collaborated with Jeffries Wyman and Changeux to extend this concept to explain cooperative behaviour of some multi-subunit proteins. This has become the most widely accepted explanation of cooperativity.

== Philosophical contributions ==
Monod was not only a biologist but also a musician and writer on the philosophy of science. He was a political activist and chief of staff of operations for the Forces Françaises de l'Interieur during World War II. In preparation for the Allied landings, he arranged parachute drops of weapons, railroad bombings, and mail interceptions.

In 1970, Monod published Le hasard et la nécessité – English translation Chance and Necessity (1971) –, a book based on a series of lectures that he had given at Pomona College in 1969. The book is a short but influential examination of the philosophical implications of modern biology, written for a general readership. Monod acknowledges his connection to the French existentialists in the epigraph of the book, which quotes the final paragraphs of Camus's The Myth of Sisyphus. In summarizing recent progress in several areas of biology, including his own research, Monod highlights the ways in which information is found to take physical form and hence become capable of influencing events in the world. For example, the information allowing a protein enzyme to "select" only one of several similar compounds as the substrate of a chemical reaction is encoded in the precise three-dimensional shape of the enzyme; that precise shape is itself encoded by the linear sequence of amino acids constituting the protein; and that particular sequence of amino acids is encoded by the sequence of nucleotides in the gene for that enzyme.

In the title of the book, "necessity" refers to the fact that the enzyme must act as it does, catalyzing a reaction with one substrate but not another, according to the constraints imposed by its structure. While the enzyme itself cannot be said in any meaningful way to have a choice about its activity, the thrust of Jacob and Monod's Nobel prize-winning research was to show how a bacterial cell can "choose" whether or not to carry out the reaction catalyzed by the enzyme. As Monod explains, one way the cell can make such a choice is by either synthesizing the enzyme or not, in response to its chemical environment. However, the synthesis/no synthesis choice is in turn governed by necessary biochemical interactions between a repressor protein, the gene for the enzyme, and the substrate of the enzyme, which interact so that the outcome (enzyme synthesis or not) differs according to the variable composition of the cell's chemical environment. The hierarchical, modular organization of this system clearly implies that additional regulatory elements can exist that govern, are governed by, or otherwise interact with any given set of regulatory components. Because, in general, the bacterial activity that results from these regulatory circuits is in accord with what is beneficial for the bacterial cell's survival at that time, the bacterium as a whole can be described as making rational choices, even though the bacterial components involved in deciding whether to make an enzyme (repressor, gene, and substrate) have no more choice about their activities than does the enzyme itself.

Monod shows a paradigm of how choice at one level of biological organization (metabolic activity) is generated by necessary (choiceless) interactions at another level (gene regulation); the ability to choose arises from a complex system of feedback loops that connect these interactions. He goes on to explain how the capacity of biological systems to retain information, combined with chance variations during the replication of information (i.e. genetic mutations) that are individually rare but commonplace in aggregate, leads to the differential preservation of that information which is most successful at maintaining and replicating itself. Monod writes that this process, acting over long periods of time, is a sufficient explanation (indeed the only plausible explanation) for the complexity and teleonomic activity of the biosphere. Hence, the combined effects of chance and necessity, which are amenable to scientific investigation, account for our existence and the universe we inhabit, without the need to invoke mystical, supernatural, or religious explanations.

While acknowledging the likely evolutionary origin of a human need for explanatory myths, in the final chapter of Chance and Necessity Monod advocates an objective (hence value-free) scientific worldview as a guide to assessing truth. He describes this as an "ethics of knowledge" that disrupts the older philosophical, mythological and religious ontologies, which claim to provide both ethical values and a standard for judging truth. For Monod, assessing truth separate from any value judgement is what frees human beings to act authentically, by requiring that they choose the ethical values that motivate their actions. He concludes that "man at last knows he is alone in the unfeeling immensity of the universe, out of which he has emerged only by chance. His destiny is nowhere spelled out, nor is his duty. The kingdom above or the darkness below: it is for him to choose". While apparently bleak, in comparison to the concepts that humanity belongs to some inevitable, universal process, or that a benevolent God created and protects us, an acceptance of the scientific assessment described in the first part of the quotation is, for Monod, the only possible basis of an authentic, ethical human life. It is reasonable to conclude that Monod himself did not find this position bleak; the quotation he chose from Camus to introduce Chance and Necessity ends with the sentence: "One must imagine Sisyphus happy."

In 1973, Jacques Monod was one of the signatories of the Humanist Manifesto II.

Sociologist Howard L. Kaye has suggested that Monod failed in his attempt to banish "mind and purpose from the phenomenon of life" in the name of science. It may be more accurate to suggest that Monod sought to include mind and purpose within the purview of scientific investigation, rather than attributing them to supernatural or divine causes. While Monod does not explicitly address mind or consciousness, his scientific research demonstrated that biology includes feedback loops that govern interacting systems of biochemical reactions, so that the system as a whole can be described as having a purpose and making choices. Monod's philosophical writing indicates that he recognized the implication that such systems could arise and be elaborated upon by evolution through natural selection. The importance of Monod's work as a bridge between the chance and necessity of evolution and biochemistry on the one hand, and the human realm of choice and ethics on the other, can be judged by his influence on philosophers, biologists and computer scientists such as Daniel Dennett, Douglas Hofstadter, Marvin Minsky and Richard Dawkins.

== Awards and honours ==
In addition to sharing a Nobel Prize, Monod was also a recipient of the Légion d'honneur and elected member of the American Academy of Arts and Sciences in 1960. He was elected a member of the National Academy of Sciences, the American Philosophical Society, and a Foreign Member of the Royal Society in 1968. The Institut Jacques Monod, funded jointly by the CNRS and the University of Paris, is one of the main centers for basic research in biology in the Paris area. It is headed by Michel Werner, Research Director.

== Personal life ==
Monod was born in Paris to an American mother from Milwaukee, Charlotte (Sharlie) MacGregor Todd, and a French Huguenot father, Lucien Monod, who was a painter and inspired him artistically and intellectually. He attended the lycée at Cannes until he was 18. In October 1928 he started his studies in biology at the University of Paris.

In 1938 he married Odette Bruhl (d.1972).

During World War II, Monod was active in the French Resistance, eventually becoming the chief of staff of the French Forces of the Interior. He was a Chevalier in the Légion d'Honneur (1945) and was awarded the Croix de Guerre (1945) and the American Bronze Star Medal. Monod became a member of the French Communist Party after the end of the Second World War, but distanced himself from the party after the Lysenko Affair. He became a close friend of Albert Camus, Nobel laureate in literature who had also been active in the French Resistance and shared Monod's criticism of the Soviet system.

Monod, then a professor at the University of Paris, supported the student protests of May 68 and, along with several fellow Nobel laureates, appealed to president Charles de Gaulle on the students' behalf.

Jacques Monod died of leukemia in 1976 and was buried in the Cimetière du Grand Jas in Cannes on the French Riviera. He enjoyed sailing and playing the cello.
