= Phenyl-D-galactopyranoside =

Phenyl-d-galactopyranoside

Identifiers
| CAS Number | 56390-15-9 |
| 3D model (JSmol) | Interactive image |
| ChemSpider | 19980660 |
| MeSH | phenyl-D-galactopyranoside |
| PubChem CID | 124323 |
| UNII | PPR9P83XLW |
| CompTox Dashboard (EPA) | DTXSID101311601 |
- InChI: InChI=1S/C12H15O6/c13-6-8-9(14)10(15)11(12(16)18-8)17-7-4-2-1-3-5-7/h1-5,8-15H,6H2/q-1/t8-,9+,10+,11-,12?/m1/s1 Key: HRDZSWARBBWSQA-SCWFEDMQSA-N; InChI=1/C12H15O6/c13-6-8-9(14)10(15)11(12(16)18-8)17-7-4-2-1-3-5-7/h1-5,8-15H,6H2/q-1/t8-,9+,10+,11-,12?/m1/s1 Key: HRDZSWARBBWSQA-SCWFEDMQBF
- SMILES: [O-]C2O[C@H](CO)[C@H](O)[C@H](O)[C@H]2Oc1ccccc1

Properties
| Chemical formula | C_{12}H_{16}O_{6} |
| Molar mass | 256.252 g/mol |
- Except where otherwise noted, data are given for materials in their standard state (at 25 °C [77 °F], 100 kPa). verify (what is ?) Infobox references

Phenyl-d-galactopyranoside is a substituted galactoside.

== See also ==
- Lac operon
