= Structural gene =

Gene encoding a regulatory protein

The terms structural gene and regulatory gene date back to the mid-1960s and the work on the lac operon and the synthesis of proteins in E. coli. In that system, a single regulatory region was detected that affected the production of the proteins now known to compose the lac operon. At that time, the function of the regulatory region was not known but it was referred to as a regulatory "gene" in order to distinguish it from the known protein-coding genes.

We now know that the original regulatory "gene" encodes a regulatory protein and that other parts of the regulatory region are not genes but transcription factor binding sites.

The terms "structural gene" is no longer used in molecular biology but regulatory gene is still sometimes used to refer to genes that produce regulatory molecules (protein or RNA).
