= Isopropyl β-D-1-thiogalactopyranoside =

Isopropyl β-d-1-thiogalactopyranoside

Names
- IUPAC name Propan-2-yl 1-thio-β-ᴅ-galactopyranoside
- Systematic IUPAC name (2R,3R,4S,5R,6S)-2-(Hydroxymethyl)-6-[(propan-2-yl)sulfanyl]oxane-3,4,5-triol
- Other names Isopropyl-beta-D-thiogalactopyranoside; Isopropyl-β-D-thiogalactopyranoside; Isopropylthiogalactoside

Identifiers
CAS Number	367-93-1
3D model (JSmol)	Interactive image
ChemSpider	571154
ECHA InfoCard	100.006.094
MeSH	Isopropyl+Thiogalactoside
PubChem CID	656894
UNII	X73VV2246B
CompTox Dashboard (EPA)	DTXSID6041052
- InChI: InChI=1S/C9H18O5S/c1-4(2)15-9-8(13)7(12)6(11)5(3-10)14-9/h4-13H,3H2,1-2H3/t5-,6+,7+,8-,9+/m1/s1 Key: BPHPUYQFMNQIOC-NXRLNHOXSA-N; InChI=1/C9H18O5S/c1-4(2)15-9-8(13)7(12)6(11)5(3-10)14-9/h4-13H,3H2,1-2H3/t5-,6+,7+,8-,9+/m1/s1 Key: BPHPUYQFMNQIOC-NXRLNHOXBD
- SMILES: CC(C)S[C@H]1[C@@H]([C@H]([C@H]([C@H](O1)CO)O)O)O

Properties
Chemical formula	C_{9}H_{18}O_{5}S
Molar mass	238.30 g·mol^{−1}
- Except where otherwise noted, data are given for materials in their standard state (at 25 °C [77 °F], 100 kPa). Infobox references

Isopropyl β-d-1-thiogalactopyranoside (IPTG) is a molecular biology reagent. This compound is a molecular mimic of allolactose, a lactose metabolite that triggers transcription of the lac operon, and it is therefore used to induce protein expression where the gene is under the control of the lac operator.

== Mechanism of action ==
Like allolactose, IPTG binds to the lac repressor and releases the tetrameric repressor from the lac operator in an allosteric manner, thereby allowing the transcription of genes in the lac operon, such as the gene coding for beta-galactosidase, a hydrolase enzyme that catalyzes the hydrolysis of β-galactosides into monosaccharides. But unlike allolactose, the sulfur (S) atom creates a chemical bond which is non-hydrolyzable by the cell, preventing the cell from metabolizing or degrading the inducer. Therefore, its concentration remains constant during an experiment.

IPTG uptake by E. coli can be independent of the action of lactose permease, since other transport pathways are also involved. At low concentration, IPTG enters cells through lactose permease, but at high concentrations (typically used for protein induction), IPTG can enter the cells independently of lactose permease.

== Use in laboratory ==
When stored as a powder at 4 °C or below, IPTG is stable for 5 years. It is significantly less stable in solution; Sigma recommends storage for no more than a month at room temperature. IPTG is an effective inducer of protein expression in the concentration range of 100 μmol/L to 3.0 mmol/L. Typically, a sterile, filtered 1 mol/L solution of IPTG is added 1:1000 to an exponentially growing bacterial culture, to give a final concentration of 1 mmol/L. The concentration used depends on the strength of induction required, as well as the genotype of cells or plasmid used. If lacI^{q}, a mutant that over-produces the lac repressor, is present, then a higher concentration of IPTG may be necessary.

In blue-white screen, IPTG is used together with X-gal. Blue-white screen allows colonies that have been transformed with the recombinant plasmid rather than a non-recombinant one to be identified in cloning experiments.
