= Betaine reductase =

Enzyme

Identifiers
- EC no.: 1.21.4.4

Databases
- IntEnz: IntEnz view
- BRENDA: BRENDA entry
- ExPASy: NiceZyme view
- KEGG: KEGG entry
- MetaCyc: metabolic pathway
- PRIAM: profile
- PDB structures: RCSB PDB PDBe PDBsum
Search
- PMC: articles
- PubMed: articles
- NCBI: proteins

Betaine reductase (EC 1.21.4.4) is an enzyme that catalyzes the chemical reaction

acetyl phosphate + trimethylamine + thioredoxin disulfide $\rightleftharpoons$ N,N,N-trimethylglycine + phosphate + thioredoxin

The 3 substrates of this enzyme are acetyl phosphate, trimethylamine, and thioredoxin disulfide, whereas its 3 products are N,N,N-trimethylglycine, phosphate, and thioredoxin.

This enzyme belongs to the family of oxidoreductases, specifically those acting on X-H and Y-H to form an X-Y bond with a disulfide as acceptor. The systematic name of this enzyme class is acetyl-phosphate trimethylamine:thioredoxin disulfide oxidoreductase (N,N,N-trimethylglycine-forming).
