= Inducer =

Molecule that regulates gene expression

In molecular biology, an inducer is a molecule that regulates gene expression. An inducer functions in two ways; namely:

- By disabling repressors. The gene is expressed because an inducer binds to the repressor. The binding of the inducer to the repressor prevents the repressor from binding to the operator. RNA polymerase can then begin to transcribe operon genes.
- By binding to activators. Activators generally bind poorly to activator DNA sequences unless an inducer is present. Activator binds to an inducer and the complex binds to the activation sequence and activates target gene. Removing the inducer stops transcription.

Because a small inducer molecule is required, the increased expression of the target gene is called induction. The lac operon is one example of a natural inducible gene expression system.

Inducible gene expression systems are useful in the natural context because they allow genes to be turned on only when needed, reducing the cost to the host organism. They are also useful in genetic research and bioengineering as a simple, direct way to control gene expression.

== Function ==
Repressor proteins bind to the DNA strand and prevent RNA polymerase from being able to attach to the DNA and synthesize mRNA. Inducers bind to repressors, causing them to change shape and preventing them from binding to DNA. Therefore, they allow transcription, and thus gene expression, to take place.

For a gene to be expressed, its DNA sequence must be copied (in a process known as transcription) to make a smaller, mobile molecule called messenger RNA (mRNA), which carries the instructions for making a protein to the site where the protein is manufactured (in a process known as translation). Many different types of proteins can affect the level of gene expression by promoting or preventing transcription. In prokaryotes (such as bacteria), these proteins often act on a portion of DNA known as the operator at the beginning of the gene. Transcription begins when RNA polymerase, the enzyme that copies the genetic sequence and synthesizes the mRNA, attaches to the DNA strand, which it does at a spot called a promoter.

Some genes are modulated by activators, which have the opposite effect on gene expression as repressors. Inducers can also bind to activator proteins, allowing them to bind to the operator DNA where they promote RNA transcription.

Ligands that bind to deactivate activator proteins are not, in the technical sense, classified as inducers, since they have the effect of preventing transcription.

== Examples ==
=== lac operon ===
The inducer in the lac operon is allolactose. If lactose is present in the medium, then a small amount of it will be converted to allolactose by a few molecules of β-galactosidase that are present in the cell. Allolactose binds to the repressor and decreases the repressor's affinity for the operator site.

However, when lactose and glucose are both available in the system, the lac operon is repressed. This is because glucose actively prevents the induction of lacZYA.

=== ara operon ===
In the ara operon (also known as the ara or araBAD operon), arabinose acts as both an inducer and a repressor. When arabinose is present, it allosterically binds to the regulatory protein AraC, which then helps to recruit RNA polymerase for transcription.

== Potency ==
Index inducer or just inducer predictably induce metabolism via a given pathway and are commonly used in prospective clinical drug-drug interaction studies.

Strong, moderate, and weak inducers are drugs that decreases the AUC of sensitive index substrates of a given metabolic pathway by ≥80%, ≥50% to <80%, and ≥20% to <50%, respectively.
