= Lac repressor =

DNA-binding protein

Lactose operon repressor
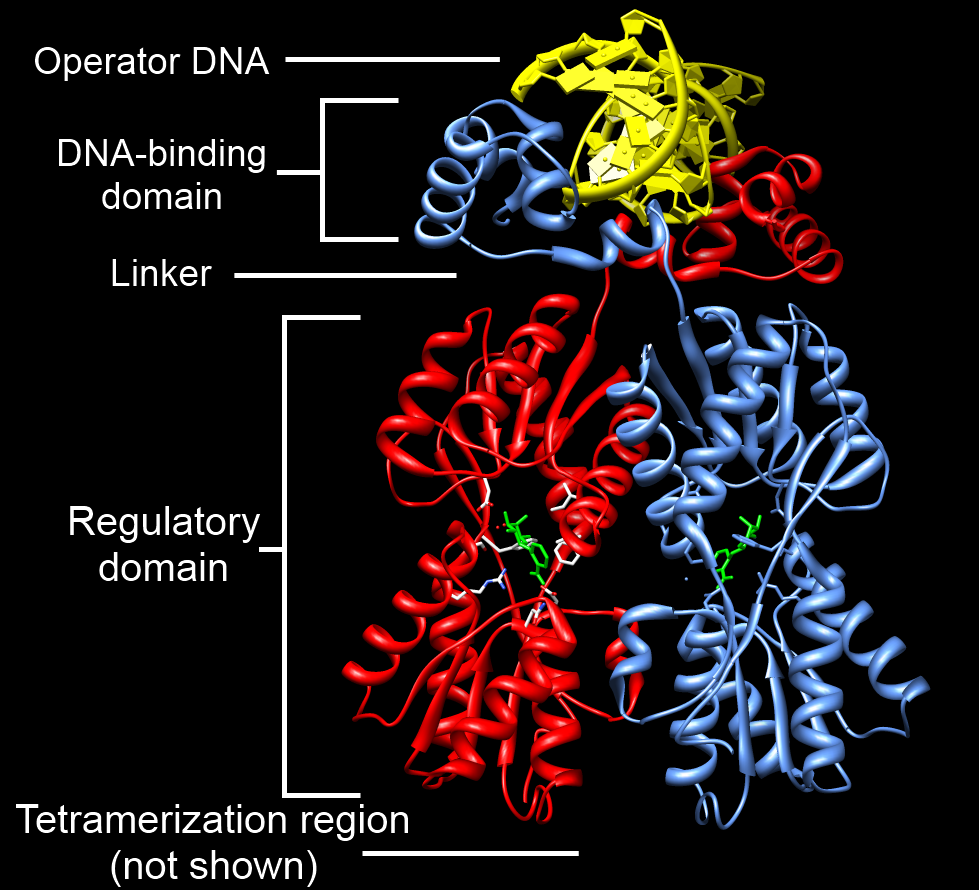
- Annotated crystal structure of dimeric LacI. Two monomers (of four total) co-operate to bind each DNA operator sequence. Monomers (red and blue) contain DNA binding and core domains (labeled) which are connected by a linker (labeled). The C-terminal tetramerization helix is not shown. The repressor is shown in complex with operator DNA (gold) and ONPF (green), an anti-inducer ligand (i.e. a stabilizer of DNA binding)

Identifiers
- Organism: Escherichia coli (strain K12)
- Symbol: LacI
- Orthologs: OMA: entry
- UniProt: P03023
Search for
- Structures: Swiss-model
- Domains: InterPro

The lac repressor (LacI) is a DNA-binding protein that inhibits the expression of genes coding for proteins involved in the metabolism of lactose in bacteria. These genes are repressed when lactose is not available to the cell, ensuring that the bacterium only invests energy in the production of machinery necessary for uptake and utilization of lactose when lactose is present. When lactose becomes available, it is firstly converted into allolactose by β-Galactosidase (lacZ) in bacteria. The DNA binding ability of lac repressor bound with allolactose is inhibited due to allosteric regulation, thereby genes coding for proteins involved in lactose uptake and utilization can be expressed.

== Function ==
The lac repressor (LacI) operates by a helix-turn-helix motif in its DNA-binding domain, binding base-specifically to the major groove of the operator region of the lac operon, with base contacts also made by residues of symmetry-related alpha helices, the "hinge" helices, which bind deeply in the minor groove. This bound repressor can reduce transcription of the Lac proteins by occluding the RNA polymerase binding site or by prompting DNA looping. When lactose is present, allolactose binds to the lac repressor, causing an allosteric change in its shape. In its changed state, the lac repressor is unable to bind tightly to its cognate operator. Thus, the gene is mostly off in the absence of inducer and mostly on in the presence of inducer, although the degree of gene expression depends on the number of repressors in the cell and on the repressor's DNA-binding affinity. Isopropyl β-D-1-thiogalactopyranoside (IPTG) is a commonly used allolactose mimic which can be used to induce transcription of genes being regulated by lac repressor.

== Structure ==
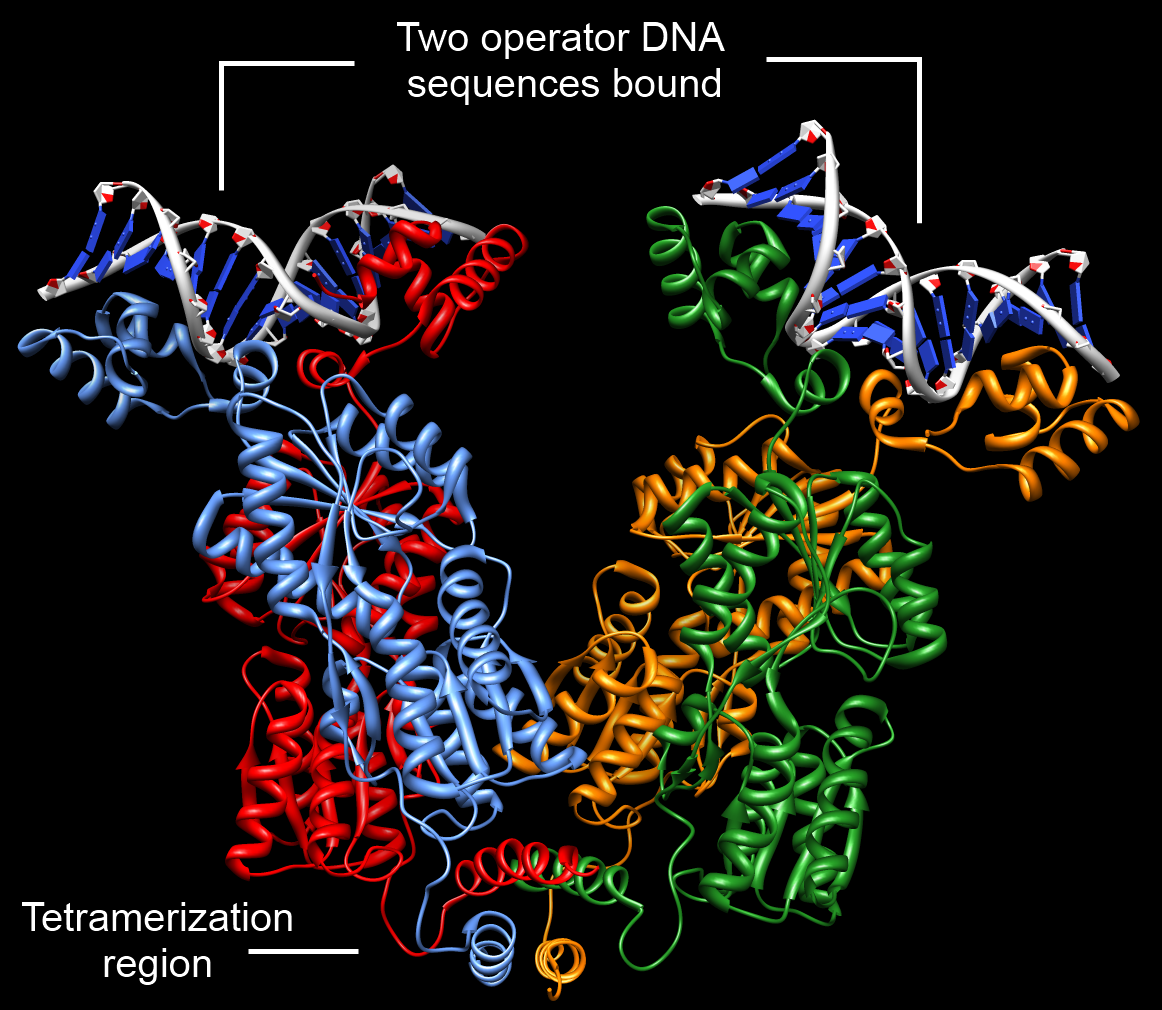
Tetrameric LacI binds two operator sequences and induces DNA looping. Two dimeric LacI functional subunits (red+blue and green+orange) each bind a DNA operator sequence (labeled). These two functional subunits are coupled at the tetramerization region (labeled); thus, tetrameric LacI binds two operator sequences. This allows tetrameric LacI to induce DNA looping (theoretical model).

Structurally, the lac repressor protein is a homotetramer. More precisely, the tetramer contains two DNA-binding subunits composed of two monomers each (a dimer of dimers). Each monomer consists of four distinct regions:

- An N-terminal DNA-binding domain (in which two LacI proteins bind a single operator site)
- A regulatory domain (sometimes called the core domain, which binds allolactose, an allosteric effector molecule)
- A linker that connects the DNA-binding domain with the core domain (sometimes called the hinge helix, which is important for allosteric communication)
- A C-terminal tetramerization region (which joins four monomers in an alpha-helix bundle)

DNA binding occurs via an N-terminal helix-turn-helix structural motif and is targeted to one of several operator DNA sequences (known as O_{1}, O_{2} and O_{3}). The O_{1} operator sequence slightly overlaps with the promoter, which increases the affinity of RNA polymerase for the promoter sequence such that it cannot enter elongation and remains in abortive initiation. Additionally, because each tetramer contains two DNA-binding subunits, binding of multiple operator sequences by a single tetramer induces DNA looping.

Each monomer has 360 amino acids, so it has 1440 amino acids in total, and 154,520 Dalton of atomic mass.

== Kinetics of DNA binding and unbinding ==
Animation of binding and unbinding mechanism of a LacI dimer and its target DNA site.

LacI finds its target operator DNA surprisingly fast. In vitro the search is 10-100 times faster than the theoretical upper limit for two particles searching for each other via diffusion in three dimensions (3D). To explain the fast search, it was hypothesized that LacI and other transcription factors (TFs) find their binding sites by facilitated diffusion, a combination of free diffusion in 3D and 1D-sliding on the DNA. During sliding the repressor is in contact with the DNA helix, sliding around and tracking its major groove, which speeds up the search process by extending the target length when the TF slides in onto the operator from the side. In vivo single-molecule experiments with E. coli cells have now tested and verified the facilitated diffusion model, and shown that the TF scans on average 45 bp during each sliding event, before the TF detaches spontaneously and resumes exploring the genome in 3D. These experiments also suggest that LacI slides over the O_{1} operator several times before binding, meaning that different DNA sequences can have different probabilities to be recognized at each encounter with the TF. This implies a trade-off between fast search on nonspecific sequences and binding to specific sequences. In vivo and in vitro experiments have shown that it is this probability to recognize the operator that changes with DNA sequence, while the time the TF remains in the bound conformation on the operator changes less with sequence. The TF often leaves the sequence it is intended to regulate, but at a strong target site, it almost always make a very short journey before finding the way back again. On the macroscopic scale, this looks like a stable interaction. This binding mechanism explains how DNA binding proteins manage to quickly search through the genome of the cell without getting stuck too long at sequences that resemble the true target.

An all-atom molecular dynamics simulation suggests that the transcription factor encounters a barrier of 1 k_{B}T during sliding and 12 k_{B}T for dissociation, implying that the repressor will slide over 8 bp on average before dissociating. The in vivo search model for the lac repressor includes intersegment transfer and hopping as well as crowding by other proteins which make the genome in E. coli cells less accessible for the repressor. The existence of hopping, where the protein slips out of the major groove of DNA to land in another nearby groove along the DNA chain, has been proven more directly in vitro, where the lac repressor has been observed to bypass operators, flip orientation, and rotate with a longer pitch than the 10.5 bp period of DNA while moving along it.

== Discovery ==
The lac repressor was first isolated by Walter Gilbert and Benno Müller-Hill in 1966. They showed that in vitro the protein bound to DNA containing the lac operon, and it released the DNA when IPTG (an analog of allolactose) was added.

== Protein family ==
LacI is the prototypical member of the LacI/GalR family (NF007075, PTHR30146), a group of transcriptional regulators with a similar structure of HTH DNA-binding domain (IPR000843), a linker, and a regulatory domain (IPR028082, G3DSA:3.40.50.2300; cd01537; PF13377); the tetramerization tail is not universal. Most of them are similarly repressors subject to allosteric moderation, but some act as activators (sometimes in addition to repression like CcpA, sometimes mainly/only activation like in Lactobacillus MalR). The number of operons they control also vary. Chimeric regulators have been made by mixing the HTH and regulatory domains from different regulators of the family.

Allosteric binding can either increase or decrease a LacI-like regulator's ability to bind DNA. The effect can vary depending on the specific ligand bound: inducers (e.g. allolactose and IPTG), anti-inducers, and neutral ligands (e.g. ONPG) are known for tetrameric LacI.

GalR, the other prototypical member, is the analogous regulator for the gal operon. It is less of a pure repressor, being able to also operate in a weaklier-repressing dimer in addition to the DNA-looping tetramer.

== See also ==
- Lac operon
