= Allolactose =

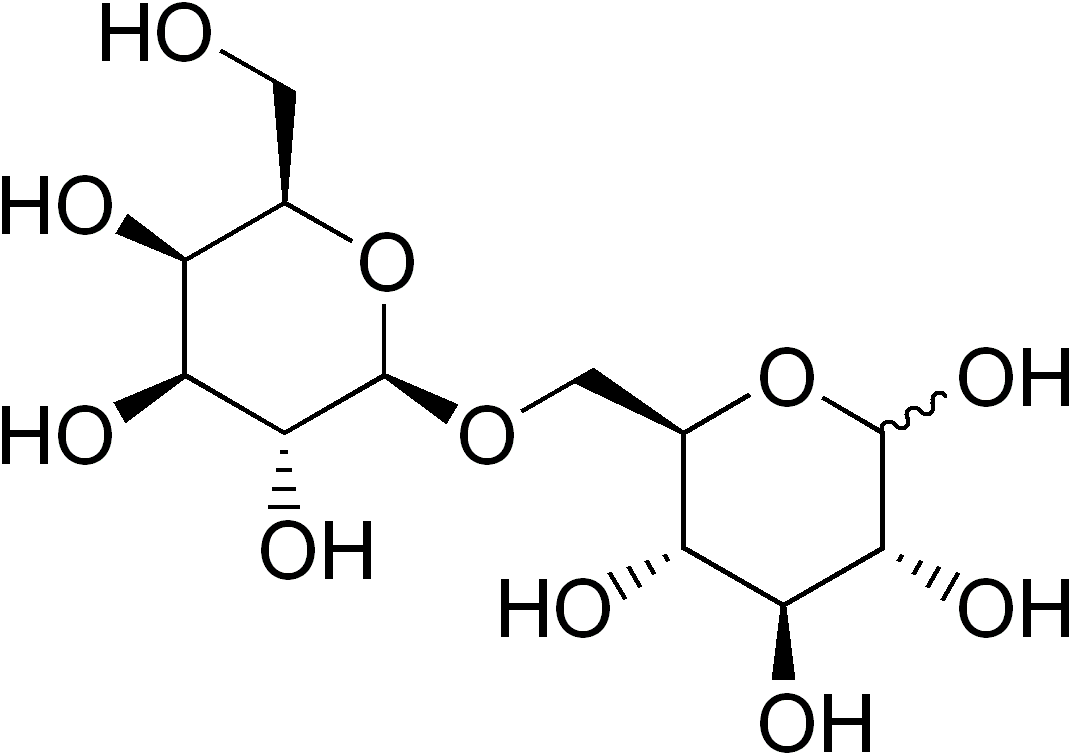

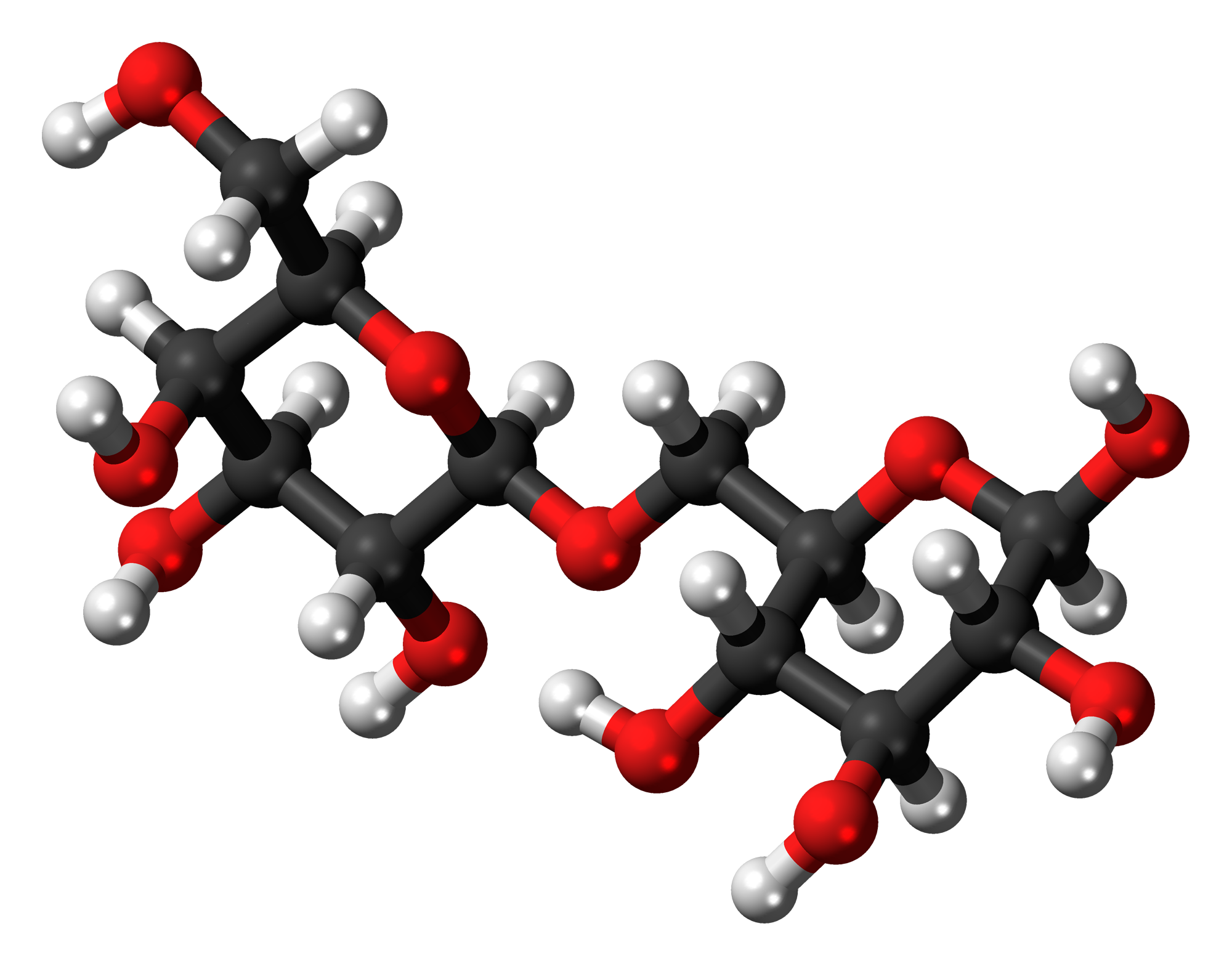

Names
- IUPAC name 6-O-β-D-Galactopyranosyl-D-glucopyranose
- Systematic IUPAC name (3R,4S,5S,6R)-6-[[(2R,3R,4S,5R,6R)-3,4,5-Trihydroxy-6-(hydroxymethyl)oxan-2-yl]oxymethyl]oxane-2,3,4,5-tetrol
- Other names 6-O-β-D-Galactopyranosyl-D-glucose; β-D-Galactopyranosyl (1→6)-D-glucose

Identifiers
CAS Number	28447-39-4
3D model (JSmol)	Interactive image
ChEBI	CHEBI:36229
ChemSpider	4957195
PubChem CID	67375559
UNII	C7B2C5KXF9
CompTox Dashboard (EPA)	DTXSID80893952
- InChI: InChI=1S/C12H22O11/c13-1-3-5(14)8(17)10(19)12(23-3)21-2-4-6(15)7(16)9(18)11(20)22-4/h3-20H,1-2H2/t3-,4-,5+,6-,7+,8+,9-,10-,11?,12-/m1/s1 Key: DLRVVLDZNNYCBX-VDGMBKLFSA-N; InChI=1/C12H22O11/c13-1-3-5(14)8(17)10(19)12(23-3)21-2-4-6(15)7(16)9(18)11(20)22-4/h3-20H,1-2H2/t3-,4-,5+,6-,7+,8+,9-,10-,11?,12-/m1/s1 Key: DLRVVLDZNNYCBX-VDGMBKLFBT
- SMILES: O[C@H]1[C@H](O)[C@H](OC(O)[C@@H]1O)CO[C@@H]2O[C@H](CO)[C@H](O)[C@H](O)[C@H]2O

Properties
Chemical formula	C_{12}H_{22}O_{11}
Molar mass	342.296 g/mol
Density	1.768 g/mL
- Except where otherwise noted, data are given for materials in their standard state (at 25 °C [77 °F], 100 kPa). verify (what is ?) Infobox references

Allolactose is a disaccharide similar to lactose. It consists of the monosaccharides D-galactose and D-glucose linked through a β1-6 glycosidic linkage instead of the β1-4 linkage of lactose. It may arise from the occasional transglycosylation of lactose by β-galactosidase.

It is an inducer of the lac operon in Escherichia coli and many other enteric bacteria. It binds to a subunit of the tetrameric lac repressor, which results in conformational changes and reduces the binding affinity of the lac repressor to the lac operator, thereby dissociating it from the lac operator. The absence of the repressor allows the transcription of the lac operon to proceed.

Although lactose is often described as the inducer of the lac operon, studies measuring inducer activity in E.coli growing on lactose have shown that allolactose is the physiological inducer. Crystal structures of the lac repressor bound to inducer galactosides show that these sugars form a hydrogen-bond network that stabilizes an induced conformation of the protein with reduced affinity for operator DNA. Allolactose acts allosterically, shifting the conformational equilibrium of the lac repressor toward a low-affinity state.

A non-hydrolyzable analog of allolactose, isopropyl β-D-1-thiogalactopyranoside (IPTG), is normally used in molecular biology to induce the lac operon. In contrast to allolactose, which is hydrolyzed by β-galactosidase, IPTG's are not metabolized by E. coli, so their intracellular concentration remains essentially constant and they act as gratuitous inducers in experimental systems.

Mechanism of Allolactose Formation:

β-Galactosidase (lacZ) plays a dual role in the lac operon system. Not only does it break down lactose into glucose and galactose, but it also catalyzes the transformation of lactose into allolactose, the molecule that induces the lac operon. The enzyme facilitates this conversion via a glucose-binding site, which temporarily holds glucose after cleavage from lactose. Despite the enzyme’s relatively low affinity for glucose, the exact details of this glucose-binding site have remained difficult to pinpoint. Research using a modified version of β-galactosidase (G794A) has provided structural insights, confirming that the glucose in the trapped allolactose molecule binds to a specific site on the enzyme.

Incorporating Allolactose in Research:

Recent studies, such as the work by Toba, Watanabe, and Adachi (1982), have demonstrated the presence of non-lactose disaccharides, including allolactose (6-O-β-D-galactopyranosyl-D-glucose) and 6-O-β-D-galactopyranosyl-D-galactose, in commercially available yogurt. These disaccharides, alongside lactose and galactose, were identified through sophisticated gas-liquid chromatography (GLC) and mass spectrometry. The research highlighted that while lactose and galactose were found in higher concentrations (ranging from 2.11% to 3.13% and 1.11% to 1.52%, respectively), allolactose and 6-O-β-D-galactopyranosyl-D-galactose were present in much smaller quantities (0.03% to 0.09%). The ability to isolate these disaccharides from yogurt using methods like dialysis and chromatography has opened new insights into the sugar composition of yogurt, beyond the more commonly studied lactose and galactose.

== Role in lac operon modeling ==
Mathematical models of lac operon regulation often take allolactose as the central inducer variable that couples lactose metabolism to gene expression. In many data sets, sets of differential equations follow the time course of lactose permease, internal lactose, β-galactosidase, allolactose, and lac mRNA. In such models, allolactose is produced from imported lactose by β-galactosidase and removed by hydrolysis, binding to the lac repressor, and dilution by cell growth. Analyses of such models demonstrate that the feedback that involves allolactose can yield either a graded increase in lac expression with inducer concentration or, under some conditions, two stable expression states in which cells are effectively uninduced or fully induced, in agreement with experimental observations of lac operon behavior. The model used assumed that large number of cells were being used. The same ideas/models can't be simply applied to a small number of molecules and cells as the situation is different.

== See also ==
- Inducer
- Lac operon § Regulation by allolactose
- Lac repressor
