= Operon =

Group of open reading frames under the same regulation

A typical operon

In genetics, an operon is a functioning unit of DNA containing a cluster of genes under the control of a single promoter. The genes are transcribed together into an mRNA strand and either translated together in the cytoplasm, or undergo splicing to create monocistronic mRNAs that are translated separately, i.e. several strands of mRNA that each encode a single gene product. The result of this is that the genes contained in the operon are either expressed together or not at all. Several genes must be co-transcribed to define an operon.

Originally, operons were thought to exist solely in prokaryotes (which includes organelles like plastids that are derived from bacteria), but their discovery in eukaryotes was shown in the early 1990s, and are considered to be rare. In general, expression of prokaryotic operons leads to the generation of polycistronic mRNAs, while eukaryotic operons lead to monocistronic mRNAs.

Operons are also found in viruses such as bacteriophages. For example, T7 phages have two operons. The first operon codes for various products, including a special T7 RNA polymerase which can bind to and transcribe the second operon. The second operon includes a lysis gene whose function is to cause the host cell to burst.

== History ==
The term "operon" was first proposed in a short paper in the Proceedings of the French Academy of Sciences in 1960. From this paper, the so-called general theory of the operon was developed. This theory suggested that in all cases, genes within an operon are negatively controlled by a repressor acting at a single operator located before the first gene. Later, it was discovered that genes could be positively regulated and also regulated at steps that follow transcription initiation. Therefore, it is not possible to talk of a general regulatory mechanism, because different operons have different mechanisms. Today, the operon is simply defined as a cluster of genes transcribed into a single mRNA molecule. Nevertheless, the development of the concept is considered a landmark event in the history of molecular biology. The first operon to be described was the lac operon in E. coli. The 1965 Nobel Prize in Physiology and Medicine was awarded to François Jacob, André Michel Lwoff and Jacques Monod for their discoveries concerning the operon and virus synthesis.

== Overview ==
The structure of a prokaryotic operon of protein-coding genes. Regulatory sequence controls when expression occurs for the multiple protein coding regions (red). Promoter, operator and enhancer regions (yellow) regulate the transcription of the gene into an mRNA. The mRNA untranslated regions (blue) regulate translation into the final protein products.

Operons occur primarily in prokaryotes but also rarely in some eukaryotes, including nematodes such as C. elegans and the fruit fly, Drosophila melanogaster. rRNA genes often exist in operons that have been found in a range of eukaryotes including chordates. An operon is made up of several structural genes arranged under a common promoter and regulated by a common operator. It is defined as a set of adjacent structural genes, plus the adjacent regulatory signals that affect transcription of the structural genes. The regulators of a given operon, including repressors, corepressors, and activators, are not necessarily coded for by that operon. The location and condition of the regulators, promoter, operator and structural DNA sequences can determine the effects of common mutations.

Operons are related to regulons, stimulons and modulons; whereas operons contain a set of genes regulated by the same operator, regulons contain a set of genes under regulation by a single regulatory protein, and stimulons contain a set of genes under regulation by a single cell stimulus. According to its authors, the term "operon" is derived from the verb "to operate".

== As a unit of transcription ==
An operon contains one or more structural genes which are generally transcribed into one polycistronic mRNA (a single mRNA molecule that codes for more than one protein). However, the definition of an operon does not require the mRNA to be polycistronic, though in practice, it usually is. Upstream of the structural genes lies a promoter sequence which provides a site for RNA polymerase to bind and initiate transcription. Close to the promoter lies a section of DNA called an operator.

== Operons versus clustering of prokaryotic genes ==
All the structural genes of an operon are turned ON or OFF together, due to a single promoter and operator upstream to them, but sometimes more control over the gene expression is needed. To achieve this aspect, some bacterial genes are located near together, but there is a specific promoter for each of them; this is called gene clustering. Usually these genes encode proteins which will work together in the same pathway, such as a metabolic pathway. Gene clustering helps a prokaryotic cell to produce metabolic enzymes in a correct order. In one study, it has been posited that in the Asgard (archaea), ribosomal protein coding genes occur in clusters that are less conserved in their organization than in other Archaea; the closer an Asgard (archaea) is to the eukaryotes, the more dispersed is the arrangement of the ribosomal protein coding genes.

== General structure ==
1: RNA Polymerase, 2: Repressor, 3: Promoter, 4: Operator, 5: Lactose, 6: lacZ, 7: lacY, 8: lacA. Top: The gene is essentially turned off. There is no lactose to inhibit the repressor, so the repressor binds to the operator, which obstructs the RNA polymerase from binding to the promoter and making lactase. Bottom: The gene is turned on. Lactose is inhibiting the repressor, allowing the RNA polymerase to bind with the promoter, and express the genes, which synthesize lactase. Eventually, the lactase will digest all of the lactose, until there is none to bind to the repressor. The repressor will then bind to the operator, stopping the manufacture of lactase.

An operon is made up of 3 basic DNA components:

- Promoter – a nucleotide sequence that enables a gene to be transcribed. The promoter is recognized by RNA polymerase, which then initiates transcription. In RNA synthesis, promoters indicate which genes should be used for messenger RNA creation – and, by extension, control which proteins the cell produces.
- Operator – a segment of DNA to which a repressor binds. It is classically defined in the lac operon as a segment between the promoter and the genes of the operon. The main operator (O1) in the lac operon is located slightly downstream of the promoter; two additional operators, O2 and O3 are located at -82 and +412, respectively. In the case of a repressor, the repressor protein physically obstructs the RNA polymerase from transcribing the genes.
- Structural genes – the genes that are co-regulated by the operon.

Not always included within the operon, but important in its function is a regulatory gene, a constantly expressed gene which codes for repressor proteins. The regulatory gene does not need to be in, adjacent to, or even near the operon to control it.

An inducer (small molecule) can displace a repressor (protein) from the operator site (DNA), resulting in an uninhibited operon.

Alternatively, a corepressor can bind to the repressor to allow its binding to the operator site. A good example of this type of regulation is seen for the trp operon.

== Regulation ==
Control of an operon is a type of gene regulation that enables organisms to regulate the expression of various genes depending on environmental conditions. Operon regulation can be either negative or positive by induction or repression.

Negative control involves the binding of a repressor to the operator to prevent transcription.

- In negative inducible operons, a regulatory repressor protein is normally bound to the operator, which prevents the transcription of the genes on the operon. If an inducer molecule is present, it binds to the repressor and changes its conformation so that it is unable to bind to the operator. This allows for expression of the operon. The lac operon is a negatively controlled inducible operon, where the inducer molecule is allolactose.
- In negative repressible operons, transcription of the operon normally takes place. Repressor proteins are produced by a regulator gene, but they are unable to bind to the operator in their normal conformation. However, certain molecules called corepressors are bound by the repressor protein, causing a conformational change to the active site. The activated repressor protein binds to the operator and prevents transcription. The trp operon, involved in the synthesis of tryptophan (which itself acts as the corepressor), is a negatively controlled repressible operon.

Operons can also be positively controlled. With positive control, an activator protein stimulates transcription by binding to DNA (usually at a site other than the operator).

- In positive inducible operons, activator proteins are normally unable to bind to the pertinent DNA. When an inducer is bound by the activator protein, it undergoes a change in conformation so that it can bind to the DNA and activate transcription. Examples of positive inducible operons include the MerR family of transcriptional activators.
- In positive repressible operons, the activator proteins are normally bound to the pertinent DNA segment. However, when an inhibitor is bound by the activator, it is prevented from binding the DNA. This stops activation and transcription of the system.

== The lac operon ==
The lac operon of the model bacterium Escherichia coli was the first operon to be discovered and provides a typical example of operon function. It consists of three adjacent structural genes, a promoter, a terminator, and an operator. The lac operon is regulated by several factors including the availability of glucose and lactose. It can be activated by allolactose. Lactose binds to the repressor protein and prevents it from repressing gene transcription. This is an example of the derepressible (from above: negative inducible) model. So it is a negative inducible operon induced by presence of lactose or allolactose.

== The trp operon ==
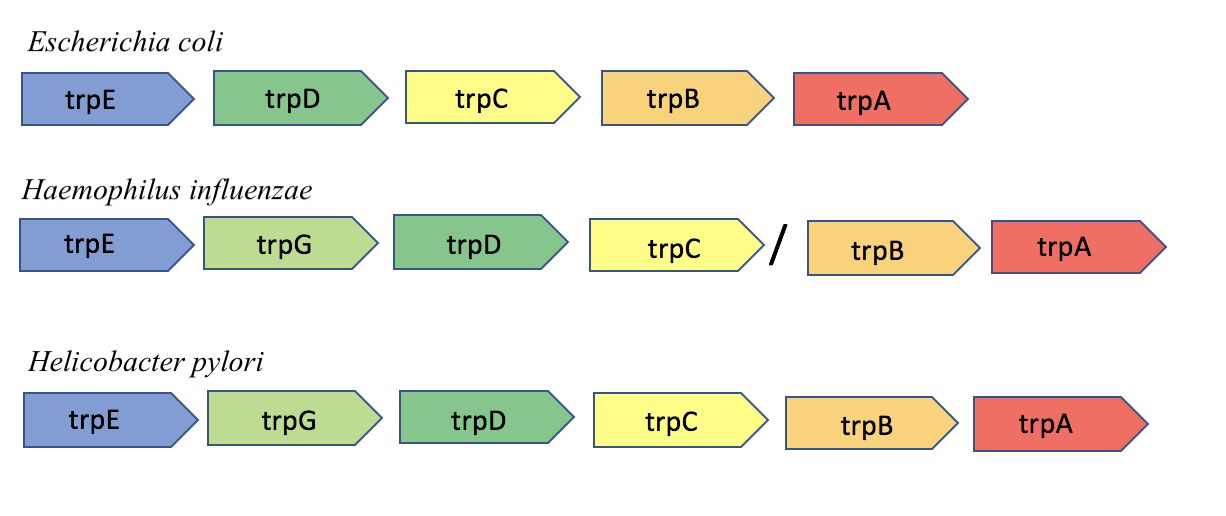
Arrangement of genes within the trp operon of three bacterial genomes.

Discovered in 1953 by Jacques Monod and colleagues, the trp operon in E. coli was the first repressible operon to be discovered. While the lac operon can be activated by a chemical (allolactose), the tryptophan (Trp) operon is inhibited by a chemical (tryptophan). This operon contains five structural genes: trp E, trp D, trp C, trp B, and trp A, which encodes tryptophan synthetase. It also contains a promoter which binds to RNA polymerase and an operator which blocks transcription when bound to the protein synthesized by the repressor gene (trp R) that binds to the operator. In the lac operon, lactose binds to the repressor protein and prevents it from repressing gene transcription, while in the trp operon, tryptophan binds to the repressor protein and enables it to repress gene transcription. Also unlike the lac operon, the trp operon contains a leader peptide and an attenuator sequence which allows for graded regulation. This is an example of the corepressible model.

== Predicting the number and organization of operons ==
The number and organization of operons has been studied most critically in E. coli. As a result, predictions can be made based on an organism's genomic sequence.

One prediction method uses the intergenic distance between reading frames as a primary predictor of the number of operons in the genome. The separation merely changes the frame and guarantees that the read through is efficient. Longer stretches exist where operons start and stop, often up to 40–50 bases.

An alternative method to predict operons is based on finding gene clusters where gene order and orientation is conserved in two or more genomes.

Operon prediction is even more accurate if the functional class of the molecules is considered. Bacteria have clustered their reading frames into units, sequestered by co-involvement in protein complexes, common pathways, or shared substrates and transporters. Thus, accurate prediction would involve all of these data, a difficult task indeed.

Pascale Cossart's laboratory was the first to experimentally identify all operons of a microorganism, Listeria monocytogenes. The 517 polycistronic operons are listed in a 2009 study describing the global changes in transcription that occur in L. monocytogenes under different conditions.

== Operons response to genome-wide stresses ==
Primary promoters are the main controllers of operons. However, many operons have internal promoters. For example, half of all operons of E. coli have internal promoters. What happens when both the primary as well as the internal promoters are simultaneously perturbed? A recent study followed how each gene in each operon responded to such genome-wide stresses. They found that many transcription events of operons end prematurely in those conditions. They also found that internal promoters compensate significantly for those terminations creating a wave-like response pattern along operons. Next, it was shown that the same occurs in evolutionarily distant bacteria, such as Bacillus subtilis, Corynebacterium glutamicum, and Helicobacter pylori.

== See also ==
- Evolutionary developmental biology
- Genetic code
- Gene regulatory network
- L-arabinose operon
- Protein biosynthesis
- TATA box
- Umu Chromotest
