= Galactoside =

Class of chemical compounds

A galactoside is a glycoside containing galactose. The H of the OH group on carbon-1 of galactose is replaced by an organic moiety.

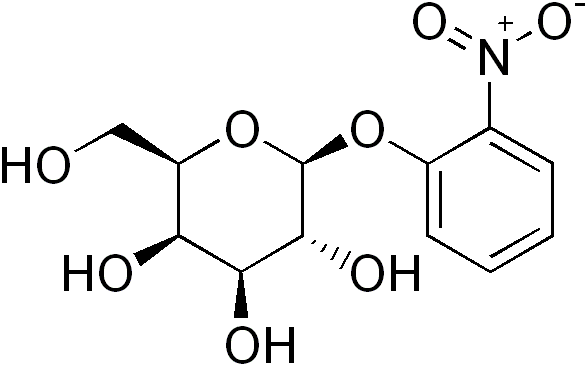
Structure of ONPG, an example of a β-galactoside.

Depending on whether the glycosidic bond lies "above" or "below" the plane of the galactose molecule, galactosides are classified as α-galactosides or β-galactosides.

A β-galactoside is a type of galactoside in which the glycosidic bond lies above the plane of the galactose residue. The most commonly recognized and used β-galactoside in biochemistry is lactose. However, other chemicals, such as ONPG, are known, but these are typically synthesized for biochemical assays.

Galactosides play significant roles in metabolic processes of many organisms and are hydrolyzed by a class of enzymes called galactosidases and are classified according to what type of glycosidic linkage on the galactoside they will break. For example, enzymes that hydrolyze the β-galactoside glycosidic bond are called β-galactosidases, while those that hydrolyze the α-galactoside glycosidic bond are known as α-galactosidases.
