= Cistron =

Region of DNA equaling a gene as defined by complementation test

A cistron is a region of DNA that is quite similar to a gene, so much so that the terms are considered synonymous by some, especially with regard to the molecular gene as contrasted with the Mendelian gene. The debate whether or not a cistron is the same thing as a gene, revolves around what size a segment of DNA constitutes as a unit of selection. The word cistron is used to emphasize that molecular genes exhibit a specific behavior in a complementation test (cis-trans test); distinct positions (or loci) within a genome are cistronic.

== History ==
The words cistron and gene were coined before the advancing state of biology made it clear that the concepts they referring to are equivalent (or nearly so). The same historical naming practices are responsible for many of the synonyms in the life sciences.

The term cistron was coined by Seymour Benzer in an article entitled The elementary units of heredity. The cistron was defined by an operational test applicable to most organisms that is sometimes referred to as a cis-trans test, but more often as a complementation test.

Richard Dawkins in his influential book The Selfish Gene argues against the cistron being the unit of selection and against it being the best definition of a gene. He does not argue against the existence of cistrons, but rather against the idea that natural selection selects them; he argues that cistrons were used for selection back in earlier eras of life's development, but fell out of favor. He defines a gene as a larger unit, referring to gene clusters, as the unit of selection. He also defines replicators, more general than cistrons and genes, in this gene-centered view of evolution.

== Definition ==
Defining a Cistron as a segment of DNA coding for a polypeptide, the structural gene in a transcription unit could be said as monocistronic (mostly in eukaryotes) or polycistronic (mostly in bacteria and prokaryotes). For example, suppose a mutation at a chromosome position $x$ is responsible for a change in recessive trait in a diploid organism (where chromosomes come in pairs). We say that the mutation is recessive because the organism will exhibit the wild type phenotype (ordinary trait) unless both chromosomes of a pair have the mutation (homozygous mutation). Similarly, suppose a mutation at another position, $y$, is responsible for the same recessive trait. The positions $x$ and $y$ are said to be within the same cistron when an organism that has the mutation at $x$ on one chromosome and has the mutation at position $y$ on the paired chromosome exhibits the recessive trait even though the organism is not homozygous for either mutation. When instead the wild type trait is expressed, the positions are said to belong to distinct cistrons / genes. Or simply put, mutations on the same cistrons will not complement; as opposed to mutations on different cistrons may complement (see Benzer's T4 bacteriophage experiments T4 rII system).

For example, an operon is a stretch of DNA that is transcribed to create a contiguous segment of RNA, but contains more than one cistron / gene. The operon is said to be polycistronic, whereas ordinary genes are said to be monocistronic.
