= Β-Galactosidase =

Family of glycoside hydrolase enzymes

β-Galactosidase
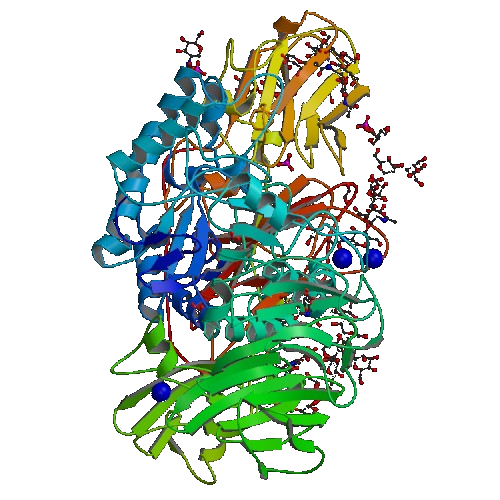
- β-galactosidase from Penicillium sp. (from PDB 1TG7)

Identifiers
- EC no.: 3.2.1.23
- CAS no.: 9031-11-2

Databases
- BRENDA: enzyme data
- ExPASy: NiceZyme view
- KEGG: enzyme entry
- MetaCyc: metabolic pathway
- Rhea: reactions
- PDB structures: RCSB PDB PDBe PDBsum
- Gene Ontology: AmiGO / QuickGO
Search
- PMC: articles
- PubMed: articles
- NCBI: proteins

galactosidase, beta 1

Identifiers
- Symbol: GLB1
- Alt. symbols: ELNR1
- NCBI gene: 2720
- HGNC: 4298
- OMIM: 230500
- RefSeq: NM_000404
- UniProt: P16278

Other data
- Locus: Chr. 3 p22.3
Search for
- Structures: Swiss-model
- Domains: InterPro

β-Galactosidase (EC 3.2.1.23, beta-gal or β-gal; systematic name β-D-galactoside galactohydrolase) is a glycoside hydrolase enzyme that catalyzes hydrolysis of terminal non-reducing β-D-galactose residues in β-D-galactosides. It is sometimes loosely referred to as lactase, but that name is technically reserved for mammalian digestive enzymes that break down lactose specifically. β-gal digests many other additional β-galactosides, which are carbohydrates containing galactose where the glycosidic bond lies above the galactose molecule. Substrates of different β-galactosidases include ganglioside GM1, lactosylceramides, lactose, and various glycoproteins.

== Function ==
β-Galactosidase is an exoglycosidase which hydrolyzes the β-glycosidic bond formed between a galactose and its organic moiety. It may also cleave fucosides and arabinosides but at a much lower rate. It is an essential enzyme in the human body. Deficiencies in the protein can result in galactosialidosis or Morquio B syndrome. In E. coli, the lacZ gene is the structural gene for β-galactosidase; which is present as part of the inducible system lac operon which is activated in the presence of lactose when glucose level is low. β-Galactosidase synthesis stops when glucose levels are sufficient.

β-Galactosidase has many homologues based on similar sequences. A few are evolved β-galactosidase (EBG), β-glucosidase, 6-phospho-β-galactosidase, β-mannosidase, and lactase-phlorizin hydrolase. Although they may be structurally similar, they all have different functions. Beta-gal is inhibited by L-ribose and by competitive inhibitors 2-phenylethyl 1-thio-β-D-galactopyranoside (PETG), D-galactonolactone, isopropyl thio-β-D-galactoside (IPTG), and galactose.

β-Galactosidase is important for organisms as it is a key provider in the production of energy and a source of carbons through the break down of lactose to galactose and glucose. It is also important for lactose-intolerant people as it is responsible for making lactose-free milk and other dairy products. Many adult humans lack the lactase enzyme, which has the same function as β-galactosidase, so they are not able to properly digest dairy products. β-Galactose is used in such dairy products as yogurt, sour cream, and some cheeses which are treated with the enzyme to break down any lactose before human consumption. In recent years, β-galactosidase has been researched as a potential treatment for lactose intolerance through gene replacement therapy where it could be placed into the human DNA so individuals can break down lactose on their own.

== Structure ==
The 1,023 amino acids of E. coli β-galactosidase were sequenced in 1983, and its structure determined eleven years later in 1994. The protein is a 464-kDa homotetramer with 2,2,2-point symmetry. Each unit of β-galactosidase consists of five domains; domain 1 is a jelly-roll type β-barrel, domain 2 and 4 are fibronectin type III-like barrels, domain 5 a novel β-sandwich, while the central domain 3 is a distorted TIM-type barrel, lacking the fifth helix with a distortion in the sixth strand.

The third domain contains the active site. The active site is made up of elements from two subunits of the tetramer, and disassociation of the tetramer into dimers removes critical elements of the active site. The amino-terminal sequence of β-galactosidase, the α-peptide involved in α-complementation, participates in a subunit interface. Its residues 22–31 help to stabilize a four-helix bundle which forms the major part of that interface, and residue 13 and 15 also contributing to the activating interface. These structural features provide a rationale for the phenomenon of α-complementation, where the deletion of the amino-terminal segment results in the formation of an inactive dimer.

== Reaction ==
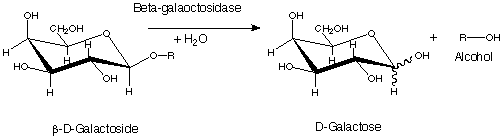
β-galactosidase reaction

β-Galactosidase can catalyze three different reactions in organisms. In one, it can go through a process called transgalactosylation to make allolactose, creating a positive feedback loop for the production of β-galactose. Allolactose can also be cleaved to form monosaccharides. It can also hydrolyze lactose into galactose and glucose which will proceed into glycolysis. The active site of β-galactosidase catalyzes the hydrolysis of its disaccharide substrate via "shallow" (nonproductive site) and "deep" (productive site) binding. Galactosides such as PETG and IPTG will bind in the shallow site when the enzyme is in "open" conformation while transition state analogs such as L-ribose and D-galactonolactone will bind in the deep site when the conformation is "closed".

The enzymatic reaction consists of two chemical steps, galactosylation and degalactosylation. Galactosylation is the first chemical step in the reaction where Glu461 donates a proton to a glycosidic oxygen, resulting in galactose covalently bonding with Glu537. In the second step, degalactosylation, the covalent bond is broken when Glu461 accepts a proton, replacing the galactose with water. Two transition states occur in the deep site of the enzyme during the reaction, once after each step. When water participates in the reaction, galactose is formed, otherwise, when D-glucose acts as the acceptor in the second step, transgalactosylation occurs . It has been kinetically measured that single tetramers of the protein catalyze reactions at a rate of 38,500 ± 900 reactions per minute. Monovalent potassium ions (K^{+}) as well as divalent magnesium ions (Mg^{2+}) are required for the enzyme's optimal activity. The β-linkage of the substrate is cleaved by a terminal carboxyl group on the side chain of a glutamic acid.

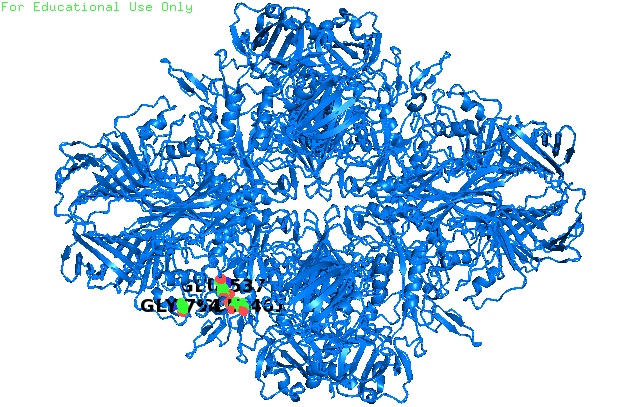
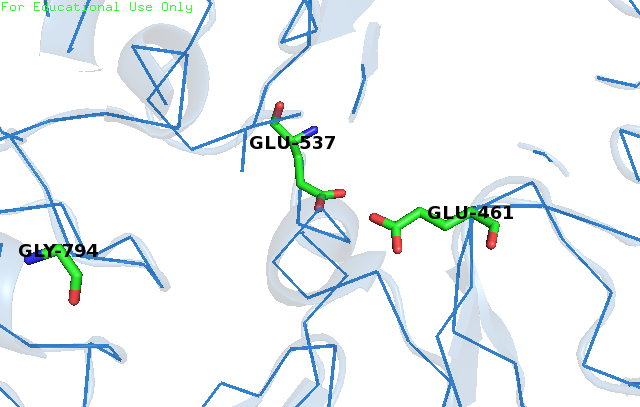
The image on the left is a ribbon diagram of beta-galactosidase displaying the location of Glu 461, Glu 537, and Gly 794. The image on the right is a zoomed in version showing the interaction between the amino acids.

In E. coli, Glu-461 was thought to be the nucleophile in the substitution reaction. However, it is now known that Glu-461 is an acid catalyst. Instead, Glu-537 is the actual nucleophile, binding to a galactosyl intermediate. In humans, the nucleophile of the hydrolysis reaction is Glu-268. Gly794 is important for β-galactosidase activity. It is responsible for putting the enzyme in a "closed", ligand bounded, conformation or "open" conformation, acting like a "hinge" for the active site loop. The different conformations ensure that only preferential binding occurs in the active site. In the presence of a slow substrate, Gly794 activity increased as well as an increase in galactosylation and decrease in degalactosylation.

== Applications ==
The β-galactosidase assay is used frequently in genetics, molecular biology, and other life sciences. An active enzyme may be detected using artificial chromogenic substrate 5-bromo-4-chloro-3-indolyl-β-D-galactopyranoside, X-gal. β-galactosidase will cleave the glycosidic bond in X-gal and form galactose and 5-bromo-4-chloro-3-hydroxyindole which dimerizes and oxidizes to 5,5'-dibromo-4,4'-dichloro-indigo, an intense blue product that is easy to identify and quantify. It is used for example in blue white screen. Its production may be induced by a non-hydrolyzable analog of allolactose, IPTG, which binds and releases the lac repressor from the lac operator, thereby allowing the initiation of transcription to proceed.

It is commonly used in molecular biology as a reporter marker to monitor gene expression. It also exhibits a phenomenon called α-complementation which forms the basis for the blue/white screening of recombinant clones. This enzyme can be split in two peptides, LacZα and LacZΩ, neither of which is active by itself but when both are present together, spontaneously reassemble into a functional enzyme. This property is exploited in many cloning vectors where the presence of the lacZα gene in a plasmid can complement in trans another mutant gene encoding the LacZΩ in specific laboratory strains of E. coli. However, when DNA fragments are inserted in the vector, the production of LacZα is disrupted, the cells therefore show no β-galactosidase activity. The presence or absence of an active β-galactosidase may be detected by X-gal, which produces a characteristic blue dye when cleaved by β-galactosidase, thereby providing an easy means of distinguishing the presence or absence of cloned product in a plasmid. In studies of leukaemia chromosomal translocations, Dobson and colleagues used a fusion protein of LacZ in mice, exploiting β-galactosidase's tendency to oligomerise to suggest a potential role for oligomericity in MLL fusion protein function.

A recent study conducted in 2020–2021 determined that β-Galactosidase activity correlates with cellular senescence. Cellular senescence is the process where cells do not divide, but do not die either. In senescent cells β-Galactosidase activity can be overexpressed, and this can lead to various diseases afflicting a wide range of body systems. These systems include the cardiovascular system, skeletal system, and many more. Detecting senescent cells can be achieved by measuring the lysosomal β-Galactosidase activity.

A particular isoform of β-Galactosidase exclusively expressed by senescent cells was hypothesized to exist because only these types of cells showed β-Galactosidase activity at pH 6.0 (Senescence Associated beta-gal or SA-beta-gal). Specific quantitative assays were even developed for its detection. However, it is now known that this phenomenon occurs due to an overexpression and accumulation of the lysosomal endogenous β-Galactosidase, and thus it doesn't represent a distinct isoform of β-Galactosidase, nor is it a required phenotype for the progression or maintenance of the senescent state. Nevertheless, it remains the most widely used biomarker for senescent and aging cells, because it is reliable and easy to detect.

== Evolution ==
Some species of bacteria, including E. coli, have additional β-galactosidase genes. A second gene, called evolved β-galactosidase (ebgA) gene was discovered when strains with the lacZ gene deleted (but still containing the gene for galactoside permease, lacY), were plated on medium containing lactose (or other 3-galactosides) as sole carbon source. After a time, certain colonies began to grow. However, the EbgA protein is an ineffective lactase and does not allow growth on lactose. Two classes of single point mutations dramatically improve the activity of ebg enzyme toward lactose. and, as a result, the mutant enzyme is able to replace the lacZ β-galactosidase. EbgA and LacZ are 50% identical on the DNA level and 33% identical on the amino acid level. The active ebg enzyme is an aggregate of ebgA -gene and ebgC-gene products in a 1:1 ratio with the active form of ebg enzymes being an α4 β4 hetero-octamer.

== Species distribution ==
Much of the work done on β-galactosidase is derived from E. coli. However the enzyme can be found in many plants (especially fruits), mammals, yeast, bacteria, and fungi. β-galactosidase genes can differ in the length of their coding sequence and the length of proteins formed by amino acids. This separates the β-galactosidases into four families: GHF-1, GHF-2, GHF-35, and GHF- 42. E. Coli belongs to GHF-2, all plants belong to GHF-35, and Thermus thermophilus belongs to GHF-42. Various fruits can express multiple β-galactosidase genes. There are at least seven β-galactosidase genes expressed in tomato fruit development, that have amino acid similarity between 33% and 79%. A study targeted at identifying fruit softening of peaches found 17 different gene expressions of β-galactosidases. The only other known crystal structure of β-galactosidase is from Thermus thermophilus.
