= Xylose metabolism =

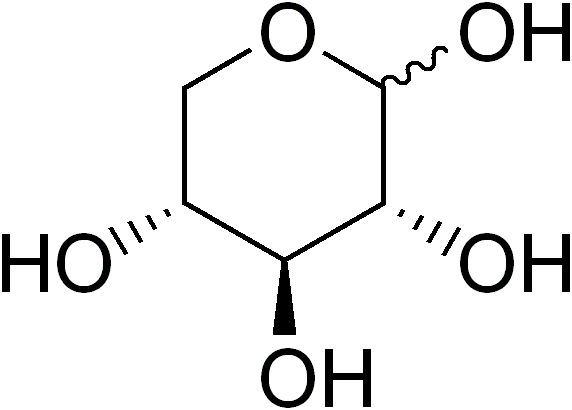
Xylose

D-Xylose is a five-carbon aldose (pentose, monosaccharide) that can be catabolized or metabolized into useful products by a variety of organisms.

There are at least four different pathways for the catabolism of D-xylose: An oxido-reductase pathway is present in eukaryotic microorganisms. Prokaryotes typically use an isomerase pathway, and two oxidative pathways, called Weimberg and Dahms pathways respectively, are also present in prokaryotic microorganisms.

== Pathways ==
=== The oxido-reductase pathway ===
This pathway is also called the “Xylose Reductase-Xylitol Dehydrogenase” or XR-XDH pathway. Xylose reductase (XR) and xylitol dehydrogenase (XDH) are the first two enzymes in this pathway. XR is reducing D-xylose to xylitol using NADH or NADPH. Xylitol is then oxidized to D-xylulose by XDH, using the cofactor NAD. In the last step D-xylulose is phosphorylated by an ATP utilising kinase, XK, to result in D-xylulose-5-phosphate which is an intermediate of the pentose phosphate pathway.

=== The isomerase pathway ===
In this pathway the enzyme xylose isomerase converts D-xylose directly into D-xylulose. D-xylulose is then phosphorylated to D-xylulose-5-phosphate as in the oxido-reductase pathway. At equilibrium, the isomerase reaction results in a mixture of 83% D-xylose and 17% D-xylulose because the conversion of xylose to xylulose is energetically unfavorable.

=== Weimberg pathway ===
The Weimberg pathway is an oxidative pathway where the D-xylose is oxidized to D-xylono-lactone by a D-xylose dehydrogenase followed by a lactonase to hydrolyze the lactone to D-xylonic acid. A xylonate dehydratase is splitting off a water molecule resulting in 2-keto 3-deoxy-xylonate. 2-keto-3-deox-D-xylonate dehydratase forms the α-ketoglutarate semialdehyde. This is subsequently oxidised via α-ketoglutarate semialdehyde dehydrogenase to yield 2-ketoglutarate which serves as a key intermediate in the citric acid cycle.

=== Dahms pathway ===
The Dahms pathway starts as the Weimberg pathway but the 2-keto-3 deoxy-xylonate is split by an aldolase to pyruvate and glycolaldehyde.

== Biotechnological applications ==
It is desirable to ferment D-xylose to ethanol. This can be accomplished either by native xylose fermenting yeasts such as Scheffersomyces Pichia stipitis or by metabolically engineered strains of Saccharomyces cerevisiae. Pichia stipitis is not as ethanol tolerant as the traditional ethanol producing yeast Saccharomyces cerevisiae. S. cerevisiae on the other hand can not ferment D-xylose to ethanol. In attempts to generate S. cerevisiae strains that are able to ferment D-xylose the XYL1 and XYL2 genes of P. stipitis coding for the D-xylose reductase (XR) and xylitol dehydrogenase (XDH), respectively were introduced in S. cerevisiae by means of genetic engineering. XR catalyze the formation of xylitol from D-xylose and XDH the formation of D-xylulose from xylitol. Saccharomyces cerevisiae can naturally ferment D-xylulose through the pentose phosphate pathway.

In another approach, bacterial xylose isomerases have been introduced into S. cerevisiae. This enzyme catalyze the direct formation of D-xylulose from D-xylose. Many attempts at expressing bacterial isomerases were not successful due to misfolding or other problems, but a xylose isomerase from the anaerobic fungus Piromyces Sp. has proven effective. One advantage claimed for S. cerevisiae engineered with the xylose isomerase is that the resulting cells can grow anaerobically on xylose after evolutionary adaptation.

Studies on flux through the oxidative pentose phosphate pathway during D-xylose metabolism have revealed that limiting the rate of this step may be beneficial to the efficiency of fermentation to ethanol. Modifications to this flux that may improve ethanol production include deleting the GND1 gene, or the ZWF1 gene. Since the pentose phosphate pathway produces additional NADPH during metabolism, limiting this step will help to correct the already evident imbalance between NAD(P)H and NAD+ cofactors and reduce xylitol byproduct formation.

Another experiment comparing the two D-xylose metabolizing pathways revealed that the XI pathway was best able to metabolize D-xylose to produce the greatest ethanol yield, while the XR-XDH pathway reached a much faster rate of ethanol production.

Overexpression of the four genes encoding non-oxidative pentose phosphate pathway enzymes Transaldolase, Transketolase, Ribulose-5-phosphate epimerase and Ribose-5-phosphate ketol-isomerase led to both higher D-xylulose and D-xylose fermentation rate.

The aim of this genetic recombination in the laboratory is to develop a yeast strain that efficiently produces ethanol. However, the effectiveness of D-xylose metabolizing laboratory strains do not always reflect their metabolism abilities on raw xylose products in nature. Since D-xylose is mostly isolated from agricultural residues such as wood stocks then the native or genetically altered yeasts will need to be effective at metabolizing these less pure natural sources.

Varying expression of the XR and XDH enzyme levels have been tested in the laboratory in the attempt to optimize the efficiency of the D-xylose metabolism pathway.
