= D-xylulose reductase =

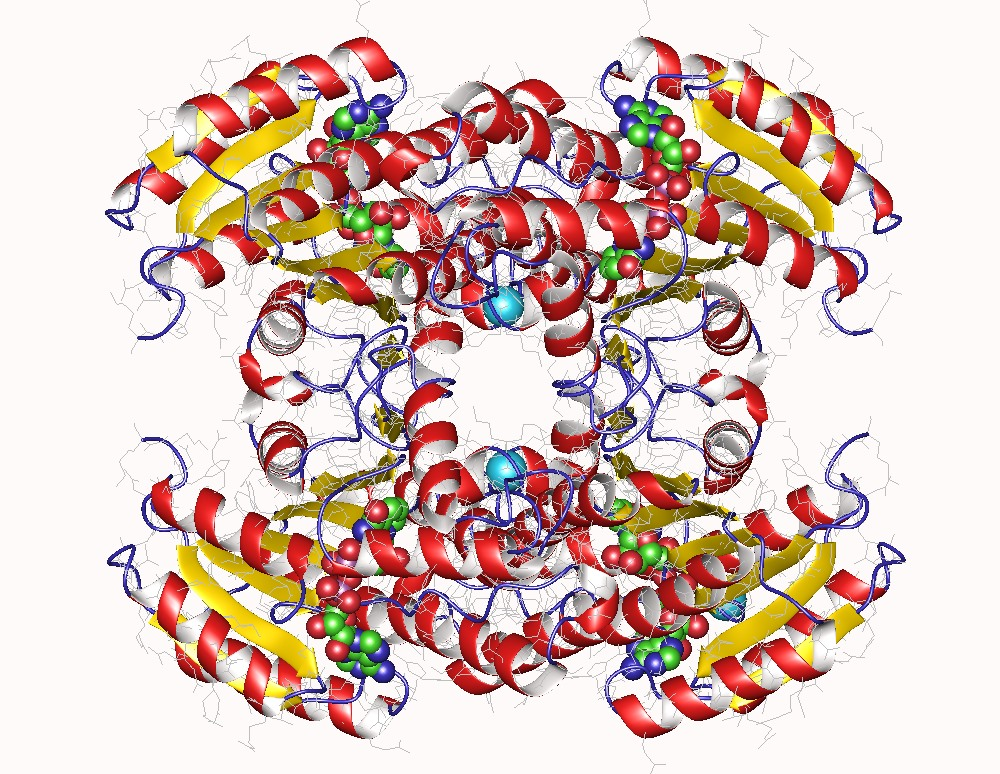
- D-xylulose reductase homotetramer, Gluconobacter oxydans

Identifiers
- EC no.: 1.1.1.9
- CAS no.: 9028-16-4

Databases
- BRENDA: enzyme data
- ExPASy: NiceZyme view
- KEGG: enzyme entry
- MetaCyc: metabolic pathway
- Rhea: reactions
- PDB structures: RCSB PDB PDBe PDBsum
- Gene Ontology: AmiGO / QuickGO
Search
- PMC: articles
- PubMed: articles
- NCBI: proteins

In enzymology, a D-xylulose reductase (EC 1.1.1.9) is a type of enzyme catalyzes the reduction of D-xylulose to xylitol, or the reverse, using NAD(H) as a cofactor. In humans, this kind of activity is found in the multi-functional enzyme SORD.

This enzyme participates in pentose and glucuronate interconversions; a set of metabolic pathways that involve converting pentose sugars and glucuronate into other compounds.

== Nomenclature ==
The systematic name of this enzyme class is xylitol:NAD^{+} 2-oxidoreductase (D-xylulose-forming). Other common names used include :

- NAD^{+}-dependent xylitol dehydrogenase
- xylitol dehydrogenase* erythritol dehydrogenase (as this enzyme also acts as an L-erythrylose reductase)
- 2,3-cis-polyol(DPN) dehydrogenase (C3-5)
- pentitol-DPN dehydrogenase, and
- xylitol-2-dehydrogenase

== EC number ==
An Enzyme Commission (EC) number is a classification identifier given to all enzymes that helps identify their function and relationships to other enzymes. The EC number for D-xylulose reductase is 1.1.1.9, the breakdown is as follows:

- EC 1: Oxidoreductase enzymes
- EC 1.1: An oxidoreductase enzyme that acts on CH-OH group of donors
- EC 1.1.1: An oxidoreductase enzyme that acts on the CH-OH group of donors that uses NAD+ or NADP+ as an acceptor.

== Catalyzed reaction ==
D-xylulose reductase catalyzes the chemical reaction

xylitol
+ NAD^{+}
H^{+}
H^{+}
D-xylulose
+ NADH

where xylitol reacts with the cofactor, oxidised nicotinamide adenine dinucleotide (NAD^{+}), to produce D-xylulose, reduced NADH and a proton.

The enzyme is a part of a class called short-chain dehydrogenase/reductases (SDRs) enzyme class which are catalyzed by the amino acid tyrosine which acts as an acid or base. Additionally, hydrogen bonding within the enzyme is thought to help with catalysis by changing the surrounding environment to be favorable towards the reaction.

== Role in metabolism ==
In cellular metabolism D-xylulose reductase is essential in various organisms. In bacteria, D-xylulose reductase is the second step of D-xylose metabolism which is necessary cellular growth. First, D-xylose is converted to xylitol which then is converted to D-xylulose when D-xylulose reductase exchanges NAD^{+} for NADH. D-xylulose then becomes phosphorylated, and proceeds through the rest of the cycle to create α-ketoglutarate which eventually enters the TCA cycle for energy production.

== Species distribution ==
D-xylulose reductase is found in both prokaryotes and eukaryotes; including molds, yeasts, and fungi.

== Structure ==
Only one structure has been solved for this enzyme, under the Protein Data Bank accession code 1ZEM. The enzyme has 262 amino acid residues and is a tetramer. Each monomer has a Rossman fold domain made up of seven β sheets side by side with three short α helices on one end of the sheet and three longer α helices on the other. There are two shorter helices that stay outside of this Rossman fold.

The N-terminal region of the primary sequence has been found to be responsible for the selectivity of binding NAD^{+}, and the active site is located between helices αFG1, αFG2 and the C-terminal end of the β sheet.

Some images of D-xylulose reductase show magnesium bound, this is because the solution used to grow the protein crystals for visualization that were used contained 100mM of MgCl_{2}. However it has been found that D-xylulose reductase is not inhibited by magnesium; it has even been suggested that magnesium may be important for stabilization and formation of the oligomers.

== Function ==
One example of a mold that uses the enzyme is Aspergillus carbonarius; where the enzyme creates an intermediate for the pentose phosphate pathway. D-xylose is converted to xylitol by xylose reductase, then xylitol is converted to xylulose by D-xylulose reductase, afterwards xylulose is converted to xylulose-5-phosphate by xylulokinase and xylulose-5-P then goes into the pentose phosphate pathway for energy and intermediates production.

In yeast, such as Hansenula polymorpha d-xylulose reductase has been found to help ferment xylose into ethanol, however it usually results in an accumulation of xylitol due to the imbalance between cofactor preferences in xylose reductase and xylulose reductase.

In fungi d-xylulose reductase also ferments xylose into ethanol as a result of metabolic conditions (such as anaerobic conditions).

== See also ==
- L-xylulose reductase
