= FGGY carbohydrate kinase family =

Family of enzymes

FGGY family of carbohydrate kinases, N-terminal domain
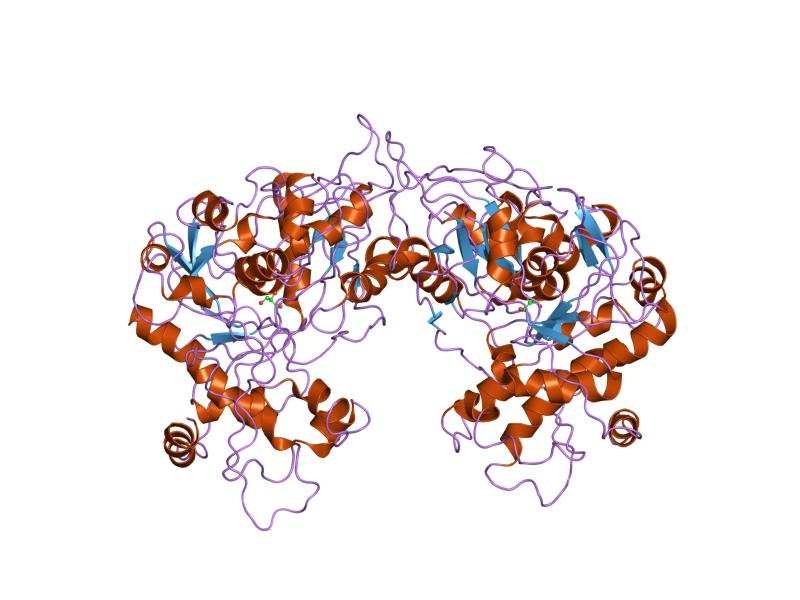
- enterococcus casseliflavus glycerol kinase complexed with glycerol

Identifiers
- Symbol: FGGY_N
- Pfam: PF00370
- Pfam clan: CL0108
- InterPro: IPR018484
- PROSITE: PDOC00408
- SCOP2: 1gla / SCOPe / SUPFAM
- CDD: cd00366
Available protein structures:
- PDB: IPR018484 PF00370 (ECOD; PDBsum)
- AlphaFold: IPR018484; PF00370

FGGY family of carbohydrate kinases, C-terminal domain
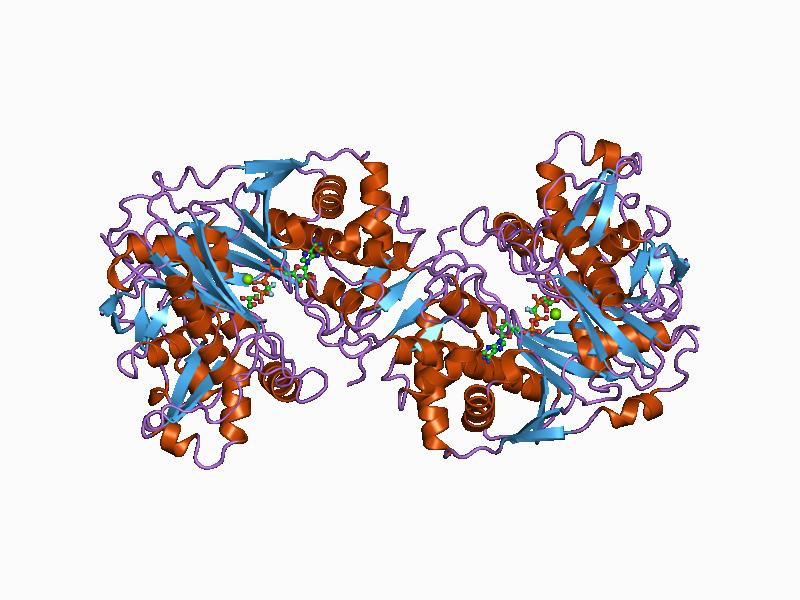
- escherichia coli glycerol kinase mutant with bound atp analog showing substantial domain motion

Identifiers
- Symbol: FGGY_C
- Pfam: PF02782
- Pfam clan: CL0108
- InterPro: IPR018485
- PROSITE: PDOC00408
- SCOP2: 1gla / SCOPe / SUPFAM
- CDD: cd00366
Available protein structures:
- PDB: IPR018485 PF02782 (ECOD; PDBsum)
- AlphaFold: IPR018485; PF02782

In molecular biology the FGGY carbohydrate kinase family is a family of evolutionarily related carbohydrate kinase enzymes. These enzymes include L-fuculokinase EC 2.7.1.51 (gene fucK); gluconokinase EC 2.7.1.12 (gene gntK); glycerol kinase EC 2.7.1.30 (gene glpK); xylulokinase EC 2.7.1.17 (gene xylB); D-ribulose kinase EC 2.7.1.47 (gene FGGY/YDR109c); and L-xylulose kinase EC 2.7.1.53 (gene lyxK). These enzymes are proteins of from 480 to 520 amino acid residues.

These enzymes consist of two domains. The N-terminal and C-terminal domains both adopt a ribonuclease H-like fold and are structurally related to each other.
