= L-arabinitol 2-dehydrogenase =

Identifiers
- EC no.: 1.1.1.13
- CAS no.: 9028-20-0

Databases
- BRENDA: enzyme data
- ExPASy: NiceZyme view
- KEGG: enzyme entry
- MetaCyc: metabolic pathway
- Rhea: reactions
- PDB structures: RCSB PDB PDBe PDBsum
- Gene Ontology: AmiGO / QuickGO
Search
- PMC: articles
- PubMed: articles
- NCBI: proteins

In enzymology, a L-arabinitol 2-dehydrogenase (EC 1.1.1.13) is an enzyme that catalyzes the chemical reaction

L-arabitinol
+ NAD^{+}
H^{+}
H^{+}
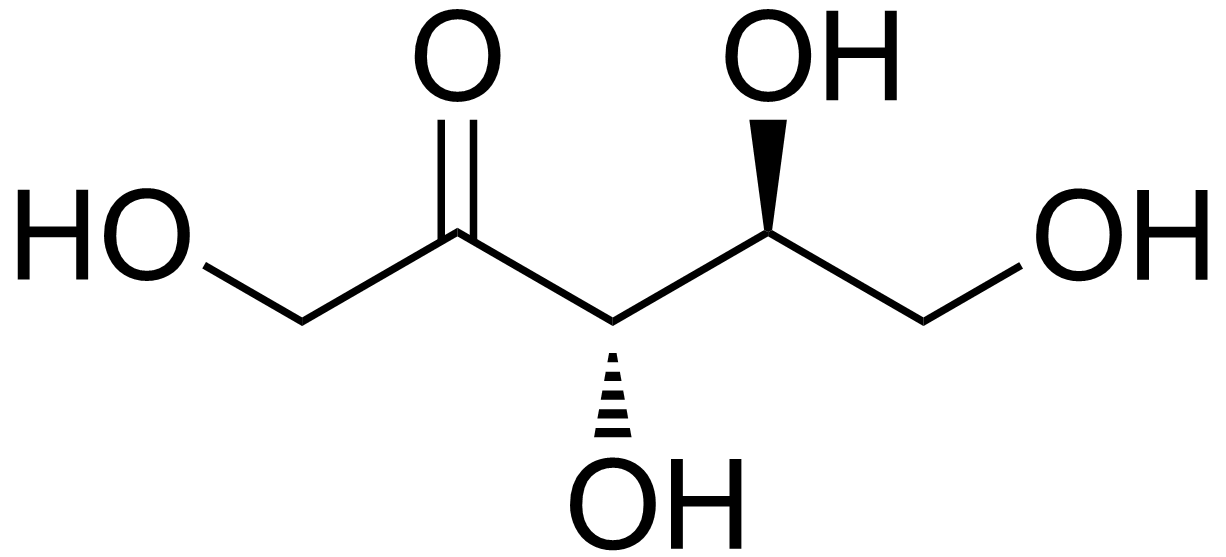
L-ribulose
+ NADH

The two substrates of this enzyme are L-arabinitol and the cofactor, oxidised nicotinamide adenine dinucleotide (NAD^{+}). Its products are L-ribulose, reduced NADH, and a proton.

This enzyme belongs to the family of oxidoreductases, specifically those acting on the CH-OH group of donor with NAD^{+} or NADP^{+} as acceptor. The systematic name of this enzyme class is L-arabinitol:NAD^{+} 2-oxidoreductase (L-ribulose-forming). Other names in common use include L-arabinitol dehydrogenase (ribulose-forming), and L-arabinitol (ribulose-forming) dehydrogenase. This enzyme participates in pentose and glucuronate interconversions.

== Isozymes ==
This type of enzyme activity was reported in the fungus penicillium chrysogenum in a 1961 paper, but currently no example enzymes of this type are reported as identified in expasy.
