= Alfred Garrod =

Alfred Garrod may refer to:

- Sir Alfred Baring Garrod (1819–1907), English physician
- Alfred Henry Garrod (1846–1879), his son, English vertebrate zoologist
