= Xylitol dehydrogenase =

Xylitol dehydrogenase may refer to:

- L-xylose 1-dehydrogenase
- NAD^{+}-dependent xylitol dehydrogenase = D-xylulose reductase
