= L-arabinitol 4-dehydrogenase =

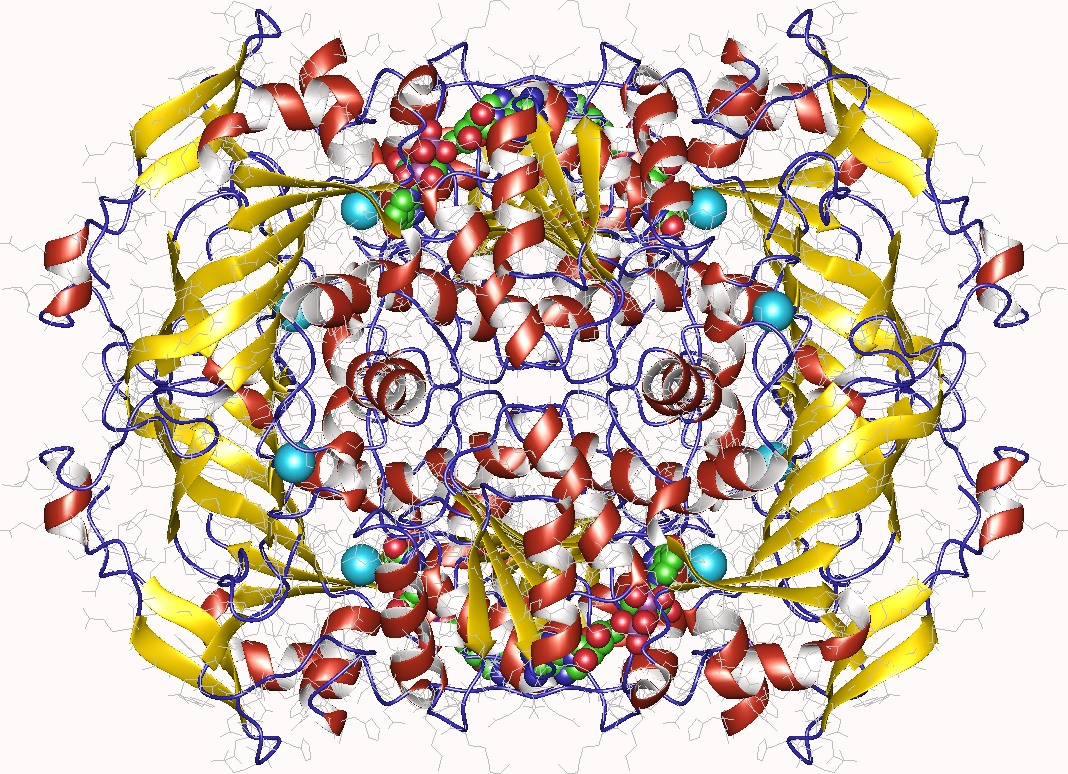
- L-arabinitol 4-dehydrogenase homotetramer, Neurospora crassa

Identifiers
- EC no.: 1.1.1.12
- CAS no.: 9028-19-7

Databases
- BRENDA: enzyme data
- ExPASy: NiceZyme view
- KEGG: enzyme entry
- MetaCyc: metabolic pathway
- Rhea: reactions
- PDB structures: RCSB PDB PDBe PDBsum
- Gene Ontology: AmiGO / QuickGO
Search
- PMC: articles
- PubMed: articles
- NCBI: proteins

L-arabinitol 4-dehydrogenases (EC 1.1.1.12) are a type of enzyme found in fungi that catalyze the chemical reaction

L-arabitinol
+ NAD^{+}
H^{+}
H^{+}
L-xylulose
+ NADH

The two substrates are L-arabinitol and oxidised nicotinamide adenine dinucleotide (NAD^{+}). The products are L-xylulose, reduced cofactor NADH, and a proton.

This enzyme belongs to the family of oxidoreductases, specifically those acting on the CH-OH group of donor with NAD^{+} or NADP^{+} as acceptor. The systematic name of this enzyme class is L-arabinitol:NAD^{+} 4-oxidoreductase (L-xylulose-forming). Other names in common use include pentitol-DPN dehydrogenase, and L-arabitol dehydrogenase. This enzyme participates in pentose and glucuronate interconversions.

== See also ==
- D-arabinitol 4-dehydrogenase
