= D-arabinitol 4-dehydrogenase =

Enzyme

D-arabitol 4-dehydrogenase

Identifiers
- EC no.: 1.1.1.11
- CAS no.: 9028-18-6

Databases
- BRENDA: enzyme data
- ExPASy: NiceZyme view
- KEGG: enzyme entry
- MetaCyc: metabolic pathway
- Rhea: reactions
- PDB structures: RCSB PDB PDBe PDBsum
- Gene Ontology: AmiGO / QuickGO
Search
- PMC: articles
- PubMed: articles
- NCBI: proteins

D-arabinitol 4-dehydrogenases (EC 1.1.1.11) are a type of enzyme found in bacteria that catalyze the chemical reaction

D-arabitinol
+ NAD^{+}
H^{+}
H^{+}
D-xylulose
+ NADH

Its two substrates are D-arabinitol and oxidised nicotinamide adenine dinucleotide (NAD^{+}). The products are D-xylulose, reduced cofactor NADH, and a proton.

This enzyme belongs to the family of oxidoreductases, specifically those acting on the CH-OH group of donor with NAD^{+} or NADP^{+} as acceptor. The systematic name of this enzyme class is D-arabinitol:NAD^{+} 4-oxidoreductase. Other names in common use include D-arabitol dehydrogenase and arabitol dehydrogenase. This enzyme participates in pentose and glucuronate interconversions and fructose and mannose metabolism.

== See also ==
- L-arabinitol 4-dehydrogenase
