= Ribitol-5-phosphate 2-dehydrogenase =

ribitol-5-phosphate 2-dehydrogenase

Identifiers
- EC no.: 1.1.1.137
- CAS no.: 37250-67-2

Databases
- IntEnz: IntEnz view
- BRENDA: BRENDA entry
- ExPASy: NiceZyme view
- KEGG: KEGG entry
- MetaCyc: metabolic pathway
- PRIAM: profile
- PDB structures: RCSB PDB PDBe PDBsum
- Gene Ontology: AmiGO / QuickGO
Search
- PMC: articles
- PubMed: articles
- NCBI: proteins

In enzymology, ribitol-5-phosphate 2-dehydrogenase (EC 1.1.1.137) is an enzyme that catalyzes the chemical reaction

D-ribitol 5-phosphate
+ NAD^{+}
H^{+}
H^{+}
D-ribulose-5-phosphate
+ NADH

The two substrates of this enzyme are D-ribitol 5-phosphate and reduced nicotinamide adenine dinucleotide (NAD^{+}). Its products are D-ribulose 5-phosphate, reduced NADH, and a proton. The enzyme can also use the alternative cofactor, nicotinamide adenine dinucleotide phosphate.

This enzyme belongs to the family of oxidoreductases, specifically those acting on the CH-OH group of donor with NAD^{+} or NADP^{+} as acceptor. The systematic name of this enzyme class is D-ribitol-5-phosphate:NAD(P)^{+} 2-oxidoreductase. This enzyme is also called dehydrogenase, ribitol 5-phosphate. This enzyme participates in pentose and glucuronate interconversions.
