= Oligogalacturonide lyase =

Lysase enzyme

oligogalacturonide lyase

Identifiers
- EC no.: 4.2.2.6
- CAS no.: 9031-33-8

Databases
- IntEnz: IntEnz view
- BRENDA: BRENDA entry
- ExPASy: NiceZyme view
- KEGG: KEGG entry
- MetaCyc: metabolic pathway
- PRIAM: profile
- PDB structures: RCSB PDB PDBe PDBsum
- Gene Ontology: AmiGO / QuickGO
Search
- PMC: articles
- PubMed: articles
- NCBI: proteins

The enzyme oligogalacturonide lyase (EC 4.2.2.6) catalyzes the chemical reaction

4-(4-deoxy-β-D-gluc-4-enuronosyl)-D-galacturonate $\rightleftharpoons$ 2 5-dehydro-4-deoxy-D-glucuronate

This enzyme belongs to the family of lyases, specifically those carbon-oxygen lyases acting on polysaccharides. The systematic name of this enzyme class is oligogalacturonide lyase. Other names in common use include oligogalacturonate lyase, unsaturated oligogalacturonate transeliminase, and OGTE. This enzyme participates in pentose and glucuronate interconversions.
