= Tagaturonate reductase =

Enzyme

tagaturonate reductase

Identifiers
- EC no.: 1.1.1.58
- CAS no.: 9028-45-9

Databases
- IntEnz: IntEnz view
- BRENDA: BRENDA entry
- ExPASy: NiceZyme view
- KEGG: KEGG entry
- MetaCyc: metabolic pathway
- PRIAM: profile
- PDB structures: RCSB PDB PDBe PDBsum
- Gene Ontology: AmiGO / QuickGO
Search
- PMC: articles
- PubMed: articles
- NCBI: proteins

Tagaturonate reductase (EC 1.1.1.58) is an enzyme that catalyzes the chemical reaction

D-Altronic acid
+ NAD^{+}
H^{+}
H^{+}
D-Tagaturonic acid
+ NADH

The two substrates of this enzyme are D-altronic acid and oxidised nicotinamide adenine dinucleotide (NAD^{+}). Its products are D-tagaturonic acid, reduced NADH, and a proton.

This enzyme belongs to the family of oxidoreductases, specifically those acting on the CH-OH group of donor with NAD^{+} or NADP^{+} as acceptor. The systematic name of this enzyme class is D-altronate:NAD^{+} 3-oxidoreductase. Other names in common use include altronic oxidoreductase, altronate oxidoreductase, TagUAR, altronate dehydrogenase, and D-tagaturonate reductase. This enzyme participates in pentose and glucuronate interconversions.
