= 2-deoxy-D-gluconate 3-dehydrogenase =

Class of enzymes

Identifiers
- EC no.: 1.1.1.125
- CAS no.: 37250-54-7

Databases
- IntEnz: IntEnz view
- BRENDA: BRENDA entry
- ExPASy: NiceZyme view
- KEGG: KEGG entry
- MetaCyc: metabolic pathway
- PRIAM: profile
- PDB structures: RCSB PDB PDBe PDBsum
- Gene Ontology: AmiGO / QuickGO
Search
- PMC: articles
- PubMed: articles
- NCBI: proteins

2-deoxy-D-gluconate 3-dehydrogenase (EC 1.1.1.125) is an enzyme that catalyzes the chemical reaction

2-deoxy-D-gluconic acid
+ NAD^{+}
H^{+}
H^{+}
3-dehydro-2-deoxy-D-gluconic acid
+ NADH

The two substrates of this enzyme are 2-deoxy-D-gluconic acid and oxidised nicotinamide adenine dinucleotide (NAD^{+}). Its products are 3-dehydro-2-deoxy-D-gluconic acid, reduced NADH, and a proton.

This enzyme belongs to the family of oxidoreductases, specifically those acting on the CH-OH group of donor with NAD^{+} or NADP^{+} as acceptor. The systematic name of this enzyme class is 2-deoxy-D-gluconate:NAD^{+} 3-oxidoreductase. This enzyme is also called 2-deoxygluconate dehydrogenase. This enzyme participates in pentose and glucuronate interconversions.

== Structural studies ==
As of late 2007, only one structure has been solved for this class of enzymes, with the PDB accession code 1X1E.
