= 3-dehydro-L-gulonate 2-dehydrogenase =

InterPro Family

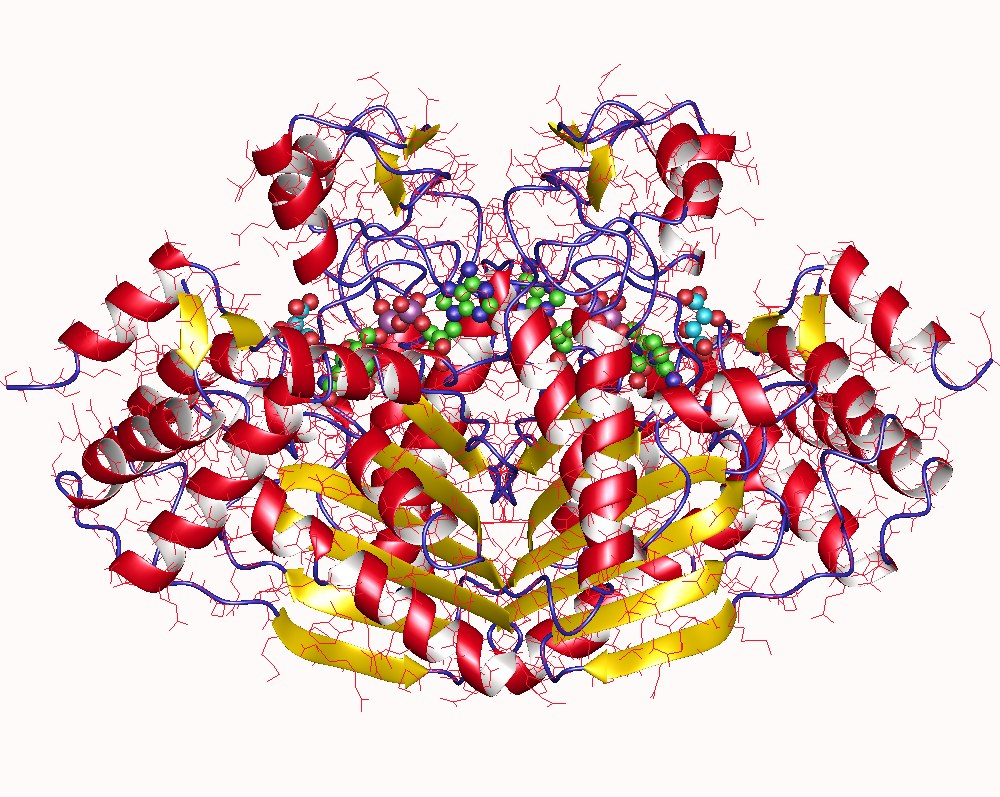
- 3-dehydro-L-gulonate 2-dehydrogenase dimer, E.Coli

Identifiers
- EC no.: 1.1.1.130
- CAS no.: 37250-61-6

Databases
- IntEnz: IntEnz view
- BRENDA: BRENDA entry
- ExPASy: NiceZyme view
- KEGG: KEGG entry
- MetaCyc: metabolic pathway
- PRIAM: profile
- PDB structures: RCSB PDB PDBe PDBsum
- Gene Ontology: AmiGO / QuickGO
Search
- PMC: articles
- PubMed: articles
- NCBI: proteins

In enzymology, 3-dehydro-L-gulonate 2-dehydrogenase (EC 1.1.1.130) is an enzyme that catalyzes the chemical reaction:

3-dehydro-L-gulonic acid
+ NAD^{+}
H^{+}
H^{+}
2,3-diketogulonic acid
+ NADH

The two substrates of this enzyme are 3-dehydro-L-gulonic acid and oxidised nicotinamide adenine dinucleotide (NAD^{+}). Its products are 2,3-diketogulonic acid, reduced NADH, and a proton. The enzyme can also use the alternative cofactor, nicotinamide adenine dinucleotide phosphate.

This enzyme belongs to the family of oxidoreductases, specifically those acting on the CH-OH group of donor with NAD^{+} or NADP^{+} as acceptor. The systematic name of this enzyme class is 3-dehydro-L-gulonate:NAD(P)^{+} 2-oxidoreductase. Other names in common use include 3-keto-L-gulonate dehydrogenase, 3-ketogulonate dehydrogenase, 3-keto-L-gulonate dehydrogenase, and 3-ketogulonate dehydrogenase. This enzyme participates in pentose and glucuronate interconversions and ascorbate and aldarate metabolism.
