= Archibald Garrod =

English physician

Archibald Garrod FRS
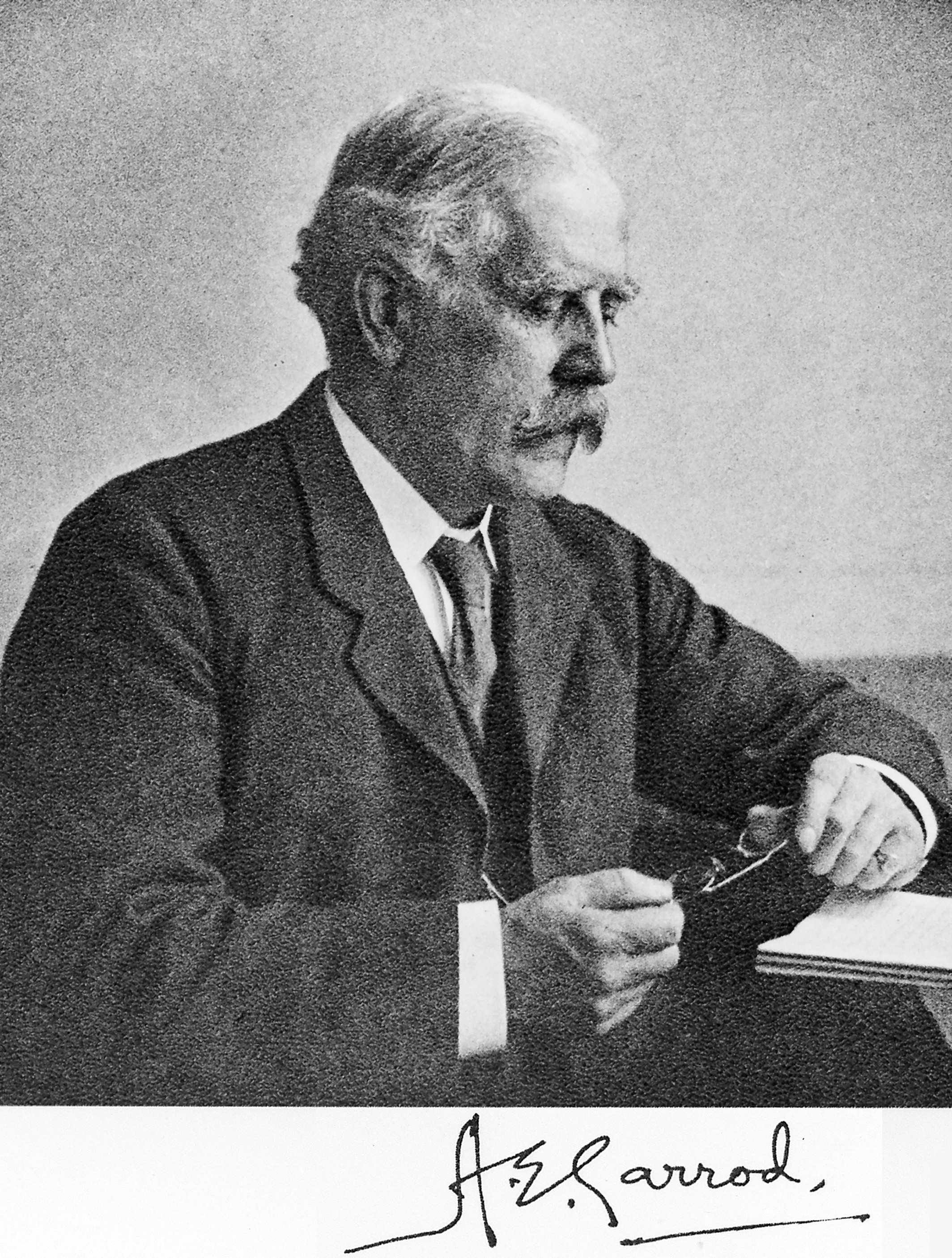
- Born: 25 November 1857; London, England
- Died: 28 March 1936 (aged 78); Cambridge, England
- Education: Christ Church, Oxford; St Bartholomew's Hospital Medical College
- Known for: Alkaptonuria, Albinism
- Scientific career
- Fields: Medicine
- Workplaces: University of Oxford

Sir Archibald Edward Garrod KCMG FRS (25 November 1857 – 28 March 1936) was an English physician who pioneered the field of inborn errors of metabolism. He also discovered alkaptonuria, understanding its inheritance. He served as Regius Professor of Medicine at the University of Oxford from 1920 to 1927.

== Education and personal life ==
Archibald was the fourth son of Sir Alfred Baring Garrod, a renowned physician who received his medical degree at the age of 23 and became a professor of medicine at University College, London by the time he was 32. He discovered the abnormal uric acid metabolism associated with gout. Garrod's father also successfully estimated the weight of crystals he obtained from a known quantity of blood, resulting in what Garrod called “the first quantitative biochemical investigation made on the living human body”. Garrod's eldest brother Alfred Henry Garrod was a successful ornithologist that named a number of bird taxa and studied specimens from the Challenger Expedition; Herbert Baring Garrod, his other elder brother also had a successful career, both as a barrister-at-law and as a scholar, writing "Dante, Goethe's Faust, and Other Lectures".

Charles Keene, a cousin, frequently visited Garrod's childhood home. Keene was an illustrator for the magazine Punch for over 40 years. Influenced by Keene, Garrod wrote an illustrated booklet called A Handbook of Classical Architecture. According to Krishna Dronamraju, Garrod displayed an interest in natural history from an early age and was particularly interested in butterflies. At the age of 12, he began collecting them and noted how few female butterflies were present, musing over possible inheritance patterns in mammals.

He was educated at Marlborough College and Christ Church, University of Oxford. He performed poorly at Marlborough, struggling due to his lack of interest in classics, especially Latin prose and grammar. He graduated with a First-class Honours (or a "First") degree in natural science in 1878.

In 1880, he received further medical training at St. Bartholomew's Hospital in London, where he obtained several scholarships including the competitive Brackenbury Scholarship. Garrod graduated in 1884 and then spent a year studying in Vienna at the general hospital, known as the Allgemeines Krankenhaus. His experiences in Vienna formed the basis for his 1886 work, An Introduction to the Use of the Laryngoscope, which was very well received. In 1885 he obtained his Bachelor of Medicine and Master of Arts from Oxford, and became a member of the Royal College of Physicians, London.

He married Laura Elizabeth Smith in 1886. They had three sons and a daughter, Dorothy Garrod, an archaeologist who was the first woman to hold an Oxbridge chair, partly through her pioneering work on the Palaeolithic period.

== First World War ==
During the First World War, Garrod served as medical consultant to the army, primarily in Malta and in 1918 was appointed Knight Commander of the Order of St Michael and St George in recognition of his wartime services.

Two of his three sons were killed in action during the war: Thomas Martin Garrod aged 20 in 1915 and Alfred Noel Garrod aged 28 in 1916.

In 1919, his third son, Basil Rahere Garrod died, aged 21, in Cologne during the Spanish flu pandemic.

== Professional career ==
Over the next 20 years he served on the attending staff of several hospitals in London: Marylebone General Dispensary, West London Hospital, St. Bartholomew's Hospital, Great Ormond Street Hospital for Children, and Alexandra Hospital for Children with hip dysplasia.

In 1892, he was appointed assistant physician at the Great Ormand Street Hospital. Dronamraju writes, “He was interested in studies of normal and pathological urine, especially in differences of their coloration. It is of interest that his interest in butterflies and flowers in childhood was also related to color differences and biological variation, and it may well have helped to sharpen his perception in this regard.”

Garrod was a proponent of scientific research as the foundation of medical practice, and published on a variety of diseases and topics throughout his career, including An Introduction to the Use of the Laryngoscope (1886) and A Treatise on Rheumatism and Rheumatoid Arthritis (1890). He helped found the Quarterly Journal of Medicine to provide a forum for more fundamental research into the processes of disease.

He helped edit a pediatrics textbook, Diseases of Children (1913), with Frederick Batten and James Hugh Thursfield.

=== Alkaptonuria and inborn errors of metabolism ===
Garrod is best known for his scientific study of inborn errors of metabolism. He developed an increasing interest in chemical pathology, and investigated urine chemistry as a reflection of systemic metabolism and disease. This research, combined with the new understanding of Mendelian inheritance, evolved from an investigation of a few families with an obscure and not very dangerous disease (alkaptonuria) to the realization that a whole territory of mysterious diseases might be understood as inherited disorders of metabolism.

In the 1890s he collaborated with Frederick Gowland Hopkins, a well-known and respected London physician and biochemist who studied the concept of how vitamins, then known as “accessory factors”, effect dietary health of patients. Under Hopkins's influence and led by his own childhood fascination with color variations, he took particular notice of how the color of urine changed.

In 1897, a mother arrived at the Great Ormand Street Hospital with an infant and a diaper stained brownish-black. Dr. Garrod recorded the family history of the baby and kept tabs on the newborn's growth over the years. He quickly began seeking other patients with the same disorder and found forty cases and read up on the disorder, the first instance of which was noted in 1822.

In 1900, the same mother became pregnant. Once the baby was born, Garrod had nurses closely inspecting the baby's diaper. Sure enough, they noted the appearance of the black urine 52 hours after the baby was born. Garrod subsequently deduced that the condition, alkaptonuria, was innate. Looking at his records, Garrod noticed that alkaptonuria was more likely to occur in the children of first cousins.

Working with William Bateson, Garrod came to understand the pattern of alkaptonuria appearance in children based on Mendelian principles. Once he applied Mendel's concepts to alkaptonuria, he published a paper in 1902 called “The Incidence of Alkaptonuria: A Study of Chemical Individuality”. In the paper, Garrod explains how he came to understand the condition and speculates as to its causes. He cites various case studies and compares alkaptonuria to albinism in how it's inherited.

In his paper, Garrod focuses on the concept of “chemical individuality” without any prior knowledge of what would come to be known as genes. He writes, “Owing, as I believe, to their chemical individuality different human beings differ widely in their liability to individual maladies, and to some extent in the signs and symptoms which they exhibit”.

Alkaptonuria is a rare familial disease of organic acid metabolism that is best known for the darkening of urine from yellow to brown to black after it is exposed to the air. In later life, individuals with this disease develop arthritis characterized by deposition of brown pigment in joint cartilage and connective tissue. Garrod studied the recurrence patterns in several families, realized it followed an autosomal recessive pattern of inheritance, and postulated that it was caused by a mutation in a gene encoding an enzyme involved in the metabolism of a class of compounds called alkapton. He published The Incidence of Alkaptonuria: a Study in Chemical Individuality in 1902.

Over the next decade he developed an understanding of the possible nature of inherited diseases of metabolism. He described the nature of recessive inheritance of most enzyme defects. In 1908, the core of this work was presented as the Croonian Lectures to the Royal College of Physicians, entitled Inborn Errors of Metabolism and published the following year. Garrod expanded his metabolic studies to cover cystinuria, pentosuria, and albinism. These three inborn errors, along with alkaptonuria are collectively called Garrod's tetrad. In 1923 he summarized these studies in an expanded edition of his best known work.

== Honours ==
As it became clearer that he had pioneered a new field of medicine, Garrod was increasingly honored in England and abroad. He succeeded William Osler as Regius Professor of Medicine at Oxford. He was elected a Fellow of the Royal Society in 1910, was appointed to the Medical Research Council, and was made an honorary member of the American Association of Physicians, and of the Ärztlicher Verein in Munich. He received honorary degrees from the universities of Aberdeen, Dublin, Glasgow, Malta, and Padua. In 1935 he was awarded the Gold Medal of the Royal Society of Medicine.

The Canadian Association of Centres for the Management of Hereditary Metabolic Diseases is commonly referred to as the Garrod Association to honor his contributions to the field of inborn errors of metabolism.

== Death ==
He died at the Cambridge home of his daughter after a brief illness in 1936.

== Publications ==
- The Nebulae: A Fragment of Astronomical History (Oxford, 1882)
- An Introduction to the Use of the Laryngoscope (1886)
- A Treatise on Rheumatism and Rheumatoid Arthritis (1890)
- A Handbook of Medical Pathology, for the Use of Students in the Museum of St Bartholomew's Hospital (1894), with Sir W.P. Herringham & W.J. Gow
- A Treatise on Cholelithiasis, Bernhard Naunyn, translated by Garrod (London, 1896)
- Clinical Diagnosis, Rudolf Von Jaksch, edited by Garrod (London, 5th ed., 1905)
- Inborn Errors of metabolism (1909), second edition 1923
- Diseases of Children (1913), with F.E. Batten & Hugh Thursfield
- The Inborn Factors of Disease (1931)

== Quotation ==
... scientific method is not the same as the scientific spirit. The scientific spirit does not rest content with applying that which is already known, but is a restless spirit, ever pressing forward towards the regions of the unknown, ... it acts as a check, as well as a stimulus, sifting the value of the evidence, and rejecting that which is worthless, and restraining too eager flights of the imagination and too hasty conclusions.

— Archibald Garrod, Archibald Garrod, "The Scientific Spirit in Medicine: Inaugural Sessional Address to the Abernethian Society", St. Bartholomew's Hospital Journal, 20, 19 (1912)

== Bibliography ==
- biography (An English archival website with a brief but more detailed biography)
- Archibald Garrod and the Individuality of Man, Alexander Gordon Bearn (Oxford, 1993). ISBN 0-19-262145-9
- Bearn, AG; Miller, ED (Fall 1979). "Archibald Garrod and the development of the concept of inborn errors of metabolism". Bull Hist Med. 53 (3): 315–28. PMID 394776.
