= Xylonate dehydratase =

Enzyme

xylonate dehydratase

Identifiers
- EC no.: 4.2.1.82
- CAS no.: 84788-77-2

Databases
- IntEnz: IntEnz view
- BRENDA: BRENDA entry
- ExPASy: NiceZyme view
- KEGG: KEGG entry
- MetaCyc: metabolic pathway
- PRIAM: profile
- PDB structures: RCSB PDB PDBe PDBsum
- Gene Ontology: AmiGO / QuickGO
Search
- PMC: articles
- PubMed: articles
- NCBI: proteins

The enzyme xylonate dehydratase (EC 4.2.1.82) catalyzes the chemical reaction:

D-xylonate $\rightleftharpoons$ 2-dehydro-3-deoxy-D-xylonate + H_{2}O

This enzyme belongs to the family of lyases, specifically the hydro-lyases, which cleave carbon-oxygen bonds. The systematic name of this enzyme class is D-xylonate hydro-lyase (2-dehydro-3-deoxy-D-xylonate-forming). Other names in common use include D-xylo-aldonate dehydratase, D-xylonate dehydratase, and D-xylonate hydro-lyase. This enzyme participates in pentose and glucuronate interconversions.
