= Rhamnulokinase =

Identifiers
- EC no.: 2.7.1.5
- CAS no.: 9030-52-8

Databases
- IntEnz: IntEnz view
- BRENDA: BRENDA entry
- ExPASy: NiceZyme view
- KEGG: KEGG entry
- MetaCyc: metabolic pathway
- PRIAM: profile
- PDB structures: RCSB PDB PDBe PDBsum
- Gene Ontology: AmiGO / QuickGO
Search
- PMC: articles
- PubMed: articles
- NCBI: proteins

Rhamnulokinase (EC 2.7.1.5) is an enzyme that catalyzes the chemical reaction

ATP +
L-rhamnulose
ADP +
L-rhamnulose 1-phosphate

The enzyme characterised from Escherichia coli converts the hexose sugar, L-rhamnulose (shown in its open-chain keto form) to L-rhamnulose 1-phosphate by transferring a phosphate group from the cofactor, adenosine triphosphate (ATP), which is converted to adenosine diphosphate (ADP). The enzyme can also act on L-xylulose. It is found in plants and its crystal structure has been determined. The main role of the enzyme is to break down L-rhamnulose

This enzyme is a transferase, specifically one transferring phosphorus-containing groups (phosphotransferases) with an alcohol group as acceptor. The systematic name of this enzyme class is ATP:L-rhamnulose 1-phosphotransferase. Other names in common use include RhuK, rhamnulokinase (phosphorylating), L-rhamnulokinase, L-rhamnulose kinase, and rhamnulose kinase.

== Structural studies ==
As of late 2007, four structures have been solved for this class of enzymes, with PDB accession codes PDB: 2CGJ, PDB: 2CGK, PDB: 2CGL, and PDB: 2UYT.
