= L-gulonate 3-dehydrogenase =

Enzyme

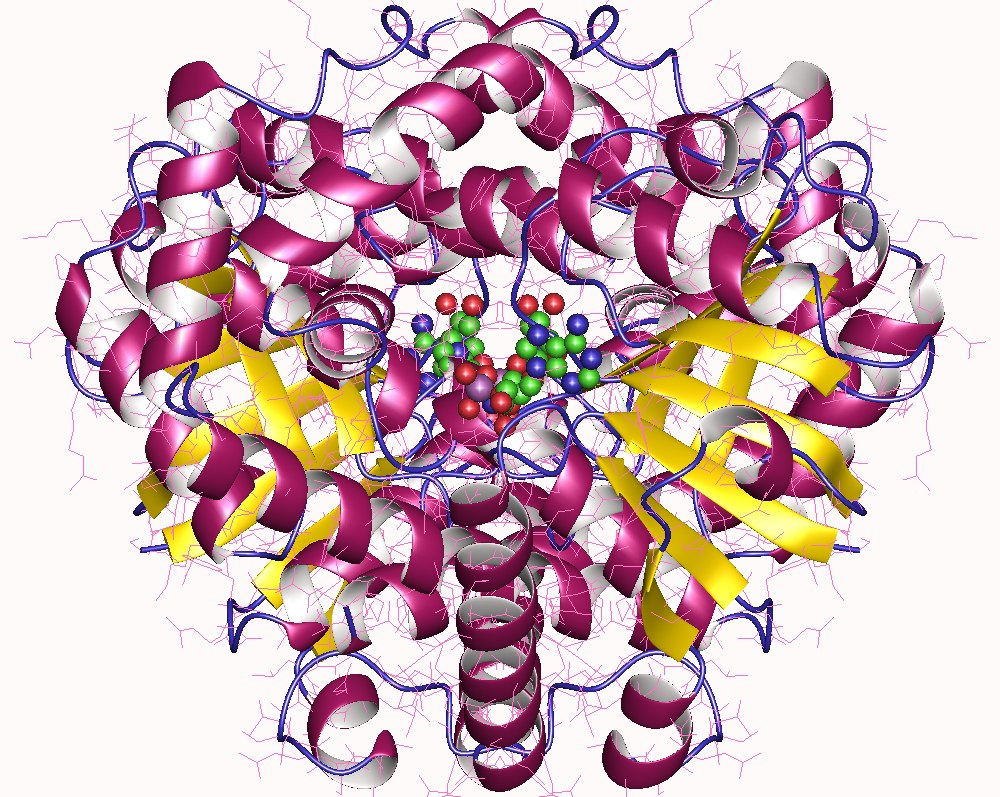

Identifiers
- EC no.: 1.1.1.45
- CAS no.: 9028-51-7

Databases
- IntEnz: IntEnz view
- BRENDA: BRENDA entry
- ExPASy: NiceZyme view
- KEGG: KEGG entry
- MetaCyc: metabolic pathway
- PRIAM: profile
- PDB structures: RCSB PDB PDBe PDBsum
- Gene Ontology: AmiGO / QuickGO
Search
- PMC: articles
- PubMed: articles
- NCBI: proteins

In enzymology, a L-gulonate 3-dehydrogenase (EC 1.1.1.45) is an enzyme that catalyzes the chemical reaction

L-gulonic acid
+ NAD^{+}
H^{+}
H^{+}
3-dehydro-L-gulonic acid
+ NADH

The two substrates of this enzyme are L-gulonic acid and oxidised nicotinamide adenine dinucleotide (NAD^{+}). Its products are 3-dehydro-L-gulonic acid, reduced NADH, and a proton.

This enzyme belongs to the family of oxidoreductases, specifically those acting on the CH-OH group of donor with NAD^{+} or NADP^{+} as acceptor. The systematic name of this enzyme class is L-gulonate:NAD^{+} 3-oxidoreductase. Other names in common use include L-3-aldonate dehydrogenase, L-3-aldonic dehydrogenase, L-gulonic acid dehydrogenase, L-beta-hydroxyacid dehydrogenase, L-beta-hydroxy-acid-NAD^{+}-oxidoreductase, and L-3-hydroxyacid dehydrogenase. This enzyme participates in pentose and glucuronate interconversions.

== Structural studies ==
As of late 2007, only one structure has been solved for this class of enzymes, with the PDB accession code 2DPO.
