= 2-dehydro-3-deoxy-D-gluconate 5-dehydrogenase =

Class of enzymes

Identifiers
- EC no.: 1.1.1.127
- CAS no.: 37250-56-9

Databases
- IntEnz: IntEnz view
- BRENDA: BRENDA entry
- ExPASy: NiceZyme view
- KEGG: KEGG entry
- MetaCyc: metabolic pathway
- PRIAM: profile
- PDB structures: RCSB PDB PDBe PDBsum
- Gene Ontology: AmiGO / QuickGO
Search
- PMC: articles
- PubMed: articles
- NCBI: proteins

In enzymology, 2-dehydro-3-deoxy-D-gluconate 5-dehydrogenase (EC 1.1.1.127) is an enzyme that catalyzes the chemical reaction

2-dehydro-3-deoxy-D-gluconic acid
+ NAD^{+}
H^{+}
H^{+}
(4S)-4,6-dihydroxy-2,5-dioxohexanoic acid
+ NADH

The two substrates of this enzyme are 2-dehydro-3-deoxy-D-gluconic acid and oxidised nicotinamide adenine dinucleotide (NAD^{+}). Its products are (4S)-4,6-dihydroxy-2,5-dioxohexanoic acid, reduced NADH, and a proton.

This enzyme participates in pentose and glucuronate interconversions.

== Nomenclature ==
This enzyme belongs to the family of oxidoreductases, specifically those acting on the CH-OH group of donor with NAD^{+} or NADP^{+} as acceptor. The systematic name of this enzyme class is 2-dehydro-3-deoxy-D-gluconate:NAD^{+} 5-oxidoreductase. Other names in common use include 2-keto-3-deoxygluconate 5-dehydrogenase, 2-keto-3-deoxy-D-gluconate dehydrogenase, 2-keto-3-deoxygluconate (nicotinamide adenine dinucleotide, (phosphate)) dehydrogenase, 2-keto-3-deoxy-D-gluconate (3-deoxy-D-glycero-2,5-hexodiulosonic, and acid) dehydrogenase.
