= D-xylose 1-dehydrogenase =

Identifiers
- EC no.: 1.1.1.175
- CAS no.: 62931-20-8

Databases
- IntEnz: IntEnz view
- BRENDA: BRENDA entry
- ExPASy: NiceZyme view
- KEGG: KEGG entry
- MetaCyc: metabolic pathway
- PRIAM: profile
- PDB structures: RCSB PDB PDBe PDBsum
- Gene Ontology: AmiGO / QuickGO
Search
- PMC: articles
- PubMed: articles
- NCBI: proteins

In enzymology, D-xylose 1-dehydrogenase (EC 1.1.1.175) is an enzyme that catalyzes the chemical reaction

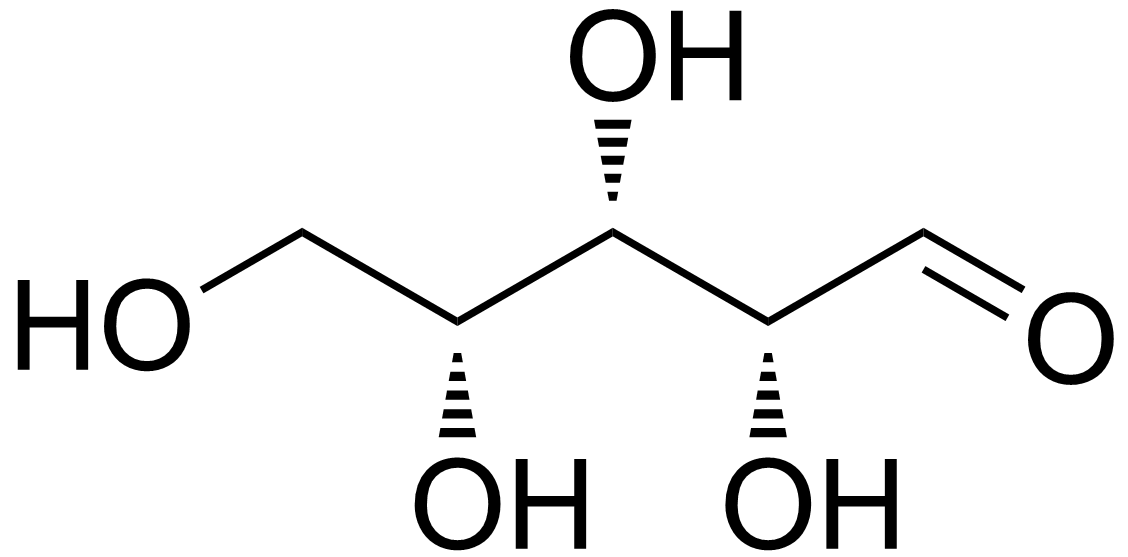
D-xylose
+ NAD^{+}
H^{+}
H^{+}
D-xylono-1,5-lactone
+ NADH

The two substrates of this enzyme are D-xylose, shown in its open-chain aldehydo form, and oxidised nicotinamide adenine dinucleotide (NAD^{+}). Its 3 products are D-xylono-1,5-lactone, reduced NADH, and a proton.

This enzyme belongs to the family of oxidoreductases, specifically those acting on the CH-OH group of donor with NAD^{+} or NADP^{+} as acceptor. The systematic name of this enzyme class is D-xylose:NAD^{+} 1-oxidoreductase. Other names in common use include NAD^{+}-D-xylose dehydrogenase, D-xylose dehydrogenase, and (NAD^{+})-linked D-xylose dehydrogenase. This enzyme participates in pentose and glucuronate interconversions.

== See also ==
- D-xylose 1-dehydrogenase (NADP+) which catalyses the same reaction using the cofactor nicotinamide adenine dinucleotide phosphate
