= Galacturan 1,4-α-galacturonidase =

Class of enzymes

Identifiers
- EC no.: 3.2.1.67
- CAS no.: 9045-35-6

Databases
- IntEnz: IntEnz view
- BRENDA: BRENDA entry
- ExPASy: NiceZyme view
- KEGG: KEGG entry
- MetaCyc: metabolic pathway
- PRIAM: profile
- PDB structures: RCSB PDB PDBe PDBsum
- Gene Ontology: AmiGO / QuickGO
Search
- PMC: articles
- PubMed: articles
- NCBI: proteins

The enzyme galacturan 1,4-α-galacturonidase (EC 3.2.1.67) catalyzes the following chemical reaction:

(1,4-α-D-galacturonide)_{n} + H_{2}O $\rightleftharpoons$ (1,4-α-D-galacturonide)_{n-1} + D-galacturonate

It belongs to the family of hydrolases, specifically those glycosidases that hydrolyse O- and S-glycosyl compounds. The systematic name is poly(1,4-α-D-galacturonide) galacturonohydrolase. Other names in common use include exopolygalacturonase, poly(galacturonate) hydrolase, exo-D-galacturonase, exo-D-galacturonanase, and exopoly-D-galacturonase. This enzyme participates in pentose and glucuronate interconversions and starch and sucrose metabolism.
