= Xylitol oxidase =

Enzyme

xylitol oxidase

Identifiers
- EC no.: 1.1.3.41
- CAS no.: 177322-52-0

Databases
- BRENDA: enzyme data
- ExPASy: NiceZyme view
- KEGG: enzyme entry
- MetaCyc: metabolic pathway
- Rhea: reactions
- PDB structures: RCSB PDB PDBe PDBsum
- Gene Ontology: AmiGO / QuickGO
Search
- PMC: articles
- PubMed: articles
- NCBI: proteins

In enzymology, xylitol oxidase (EC 1.1.3.41) is an enzyme that catalyzes the chemical reaction

xylitol
O_{2}
H_{2}O_{2}
O_{2}
H_{2}O_{2}
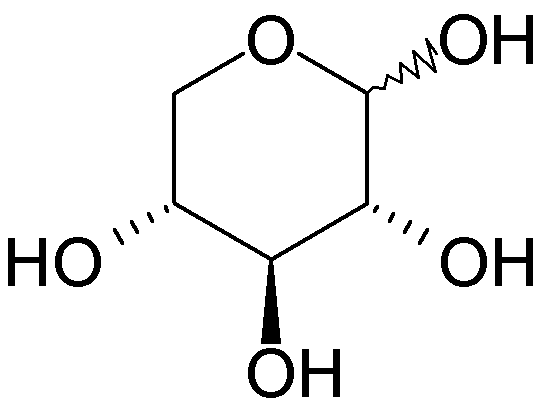
D-xylose

The two substrates of this enzyme are xylitol and oxygen. Its products are D-xylose and hydrogen peroxide. Other sugar alcohols, including sorbitol, can be oxidised by this enzyme.

This enzyme belongs to the family of oxidoreductases, specifically those acting on the CH-OH group of donor with oxygen as acceptor. The systematic name of this enzyme class is xylitol:oxygen oxidoreductase.
