= D-xylose 1-dehydrogenase (NADP+) =

D-xylose 1-dehydrogenase (NADP^{+})

Identifiers
- EC no.: 1.1.1.179
- CAS no.: 83534-37-6

Databases
- IntEnz: IntEnz view
- BRENDA: BRENDA entry
- ExPASy: NiceZyme view
- KEGG: KEGG entry
- MetaCyc: metabolic pathway
- PRIAM: profile
- PDB structures: RCSB PDB PDBe PDBsum
- Gene Ontology: AmiGO / QuickGO
Search
- PMC: articles
- PubMed: articles
- NCBI: proteins

In enzymology, D-xylose 1-dehydrogenase (NADP^{+}) (EC 1.1.1.179) is an enzyme that catalyzes the chemical reaction

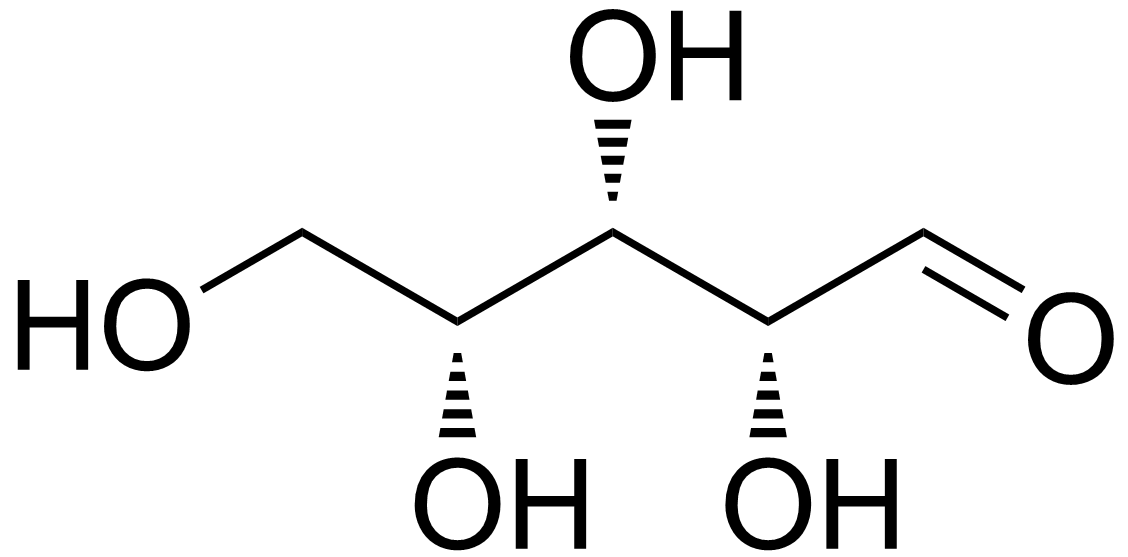
D-xylose
+ NADP^{+}
H^{+}
H^{+}
D-xylono-1,5-lactone
+ NADPH

The two substrates of this enzyme are D-xylose and oxidised nicotinamide adenine dinucleotide phosphate (NADP^{+}). Its products are D-xylono-1,5-lactone, reduced NADPH, and a proton.

This enzyme belongs to the family of oxidoreductases, specifically those acting on the CH-OH group of donor with NAD^{+} or NADP^{+} as acceptor. The systematic name of this enzyme class is D-xylose:NADP^{+} 1-oxidoreductase. Other names in common use include D-xylose (nicotinamide adenine dinucleotide phosphate), dehydrogenase, D-xylose-NADP^{+} dehydrogenase, D-xylose:NADP^{+} oxidoreductase, and D-xylose 1-dehydrogenase (NADP^{+}).

== See also ==
- D-xylose 1-dehydrogenase which catalyses the same reaction using the cofactor nicotinamide adenine dinucleotide
