= L-xylulose reductase =

Enzyme

DCXR

Identifiers
- Aliases: DCXR, DCR, HCR2, HCRII, KIDCR, P34H, PNTSU, SDR20C1, XR, dicarbonyl/L-xylulose reductase, dicarbonyl and L-xylulose reductase
- External IDs: OMIM: 608347; MGI: 1915130; GeneCards: DCXR
Available structures
PDB	Ortholog search: PDBe RCSB
PDB	List of PDB id codes 1WNT, 1PR9, 3D3W
Enzyme activity
EC #	BRENDA	ExPASy	KEGG	MetaCyc
1.1.1.10	↗	↗	↗	↗

Gene location (Human)
Chr.	Chromosome 17 (human)
Band	17q25.3	Start	82,035,136 bp
Band	17q25.3	End	82,037,709 bp

Gene location (Mouse)
Chr.	Chromosome 11 (mouse)
Band	11|11 E2	Start	120,616,225 bp
Band	11|11 E2	End	120,618,107 bp
RNA expression pattern
Bgee	Human / Mouse (ortholog); Top expressed in: right lobe of liver; corpus epididymis; body of stomach; human kidney; apex of heart; right hemisphere of cerebellum; muscle of thigh; gastric mucosa; gastrocnemius muscle; right ovary / Top expressed in: right kidney; left lobe of liver; human kidney; stroma of bone marrow; olfactory epithelium; right lung lobe; proximal tubule; trachea; left lung; lacrimal gland; More reference expression data
BioGPS	n/a
Gene ontology
Molecular function	oxidoreductase activity; oxidoreductase activity, acting on NAD(P)H, quinone or similar compound as acceptor; L-xylulose reductase (NADP+) activity; oxidoreductase activity, acting on CH-OH group of donors; identical protein binding; carbonyl reductase (NADPH) activity; L-xylulose reductase (NAD+) activity
Cellular component	nucleus; microvillus; cytoplasmic microtubule; plasma membrane; extracellular exosome; membrane; brush border
Biological process	xylulose metabolic process; NADP metabolic process; protein homotetramerization; glucuronate catabolic process to xylulose 5-phosphate; glucose metabolic process; D-xylose metabolic process; carbohydrate metabolic process
Sources:Amigo / QuickGO
Orthologs
Databases	NCBI: entry; OMA: entry
Species	Human	Mouse
Entrez	51181	67880
Ensembl	ENSG00000169738	ENSMUSG00000039450
UniProt	Q7Z4W1	Q91X52
RefSeq (mRNA)	NM_016286; NM_001195218	NM_026428; NM_001347608
RefSeq (protein)	NP_001182147; NP_057370	NP_001334537; NP_080704
Location (UCSC)	Chr 17: 82.04 – 82.04 Mb	Chr 11: 120.62 – 120.62 Mb
PubMed search
- Wikidata
View/Edit Human	View/Edit Mouse

L-xylulose reductase
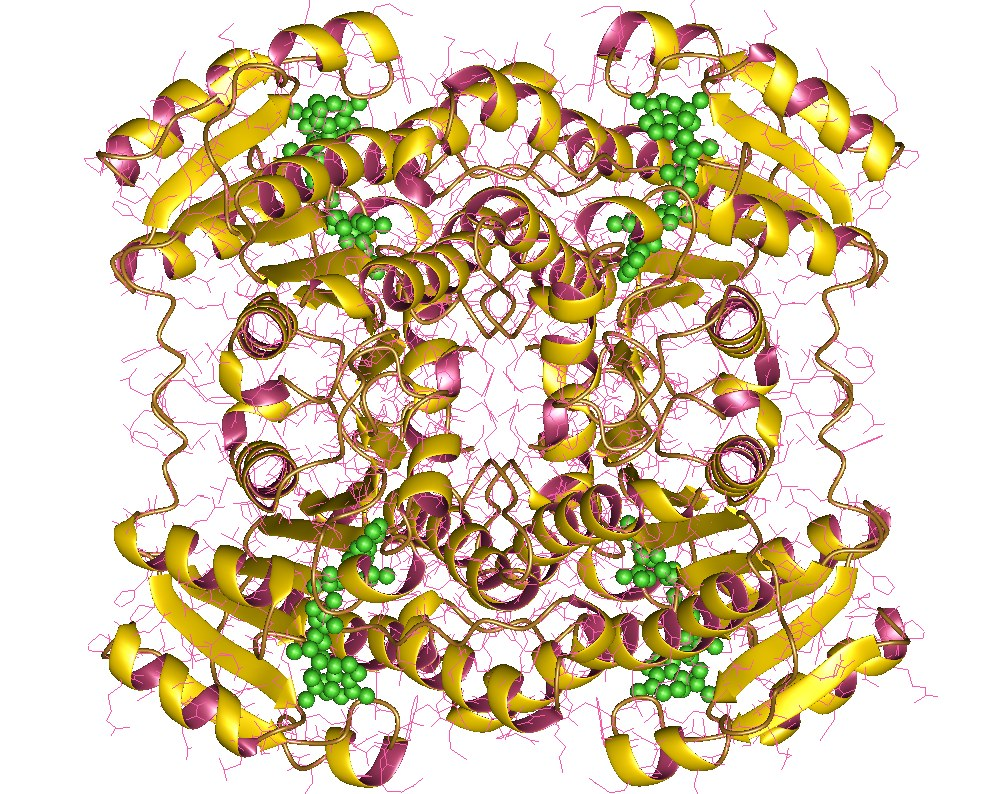
- L-Xylulose reductase tetramer, Human

Identifiers
- EC no.: 1.1.1.10

Databases
- BRENDA: enzyme data
- ExPASy: NiceZyme view
- KEGG: enzyme entry
- MetaCyc: metabolic pathway
- Rhea: reactions
- PDB structures: RCSB PDB PDBe PDBsum
Search
- PMC: articles
- PubMed: articles
- NCBI: proteins

Dicarbonyl/L-xylulose reductase, also known as carbonyl reductase II, is an enzyme that in human is encoded by the DCXR gene located on chromosome 17.

== Structure ==
The DCXR gene encodes a membrane protein that is approximately 34 kDa in size and composed of 224 amino acids. The protein is highly expressed in the kidney and localizes to the cytoplasmic membrane.

== Function ==
DCXR catalyzes the reduction of several L-xylylose as well as a number of pentoses, tetroses, trioses, alpha-dicarbonyl compounds. The enzyme is involved in carbohydrate metabolism, glucose metabolism, the uronate cycle and may play a role in the water absorption and cellular osmoregulation in the proximal renal tubules by producing xylitol.

In enzymology, L-xylulose reductase (EC 1.1.1.10) is an enzyme that catalyzes the chemical reaction

xylitol
+ NADP^{+}
H^{+}
H^{+}
L-xylulose
+ NADPH

Its two substrates are xylitol and the oxidised cofactor nicotinamide adenine dinucleotide phosphate (NADP^{+}). The products are L-xylulose, reduced NADPH, and a proton.

This enzyme belongs to the superfamily of short-chain oxidoreductases, specifically those acting on the CH-OH group of donor with NAD^{+} or NADP^{+} as acceptor. The systematic name of this enzyme class is xylitol:NADP^{+} 2-oxidoreductase (L-xylulose-forming).

== Clinical significance ==
A deficiency is responsible for pentosuria. The insufficiency of L-xylulose reductase activity causes an inborn error of metabolism disease characterized by excessive urinary excretion of L-xylulose.

Over-expression and ectopic expression of the protein may be associated with prostate adenocarcinoma.

== See also ==
- D-xylulose reductase
