= Garrod's tetrad =

In medicine, Garrod's tetrad is a term named for British physician Archibald Garrod, who introduced the phrase "inborn errors of metabolism" in a lecture in 1908.

The tetrad comprises four inherited metabolic diseases: albinism, alkaptonuria, cystinuria, and pentosuria.
