= James Hugh Thursfield =

British paediatrician

James Hugh Thursfield FRCP (July 1869 – 20 June 1944) was a British paediatrician. With Archibald Garrod and Frederick Batten he edited Diseases of Children (1913), and he edited Archives of Diseases in Childhood (founded 1926). He served as a major at the 14th General Hospital at Boulogne during the First World War.
