= Xylulokinase =

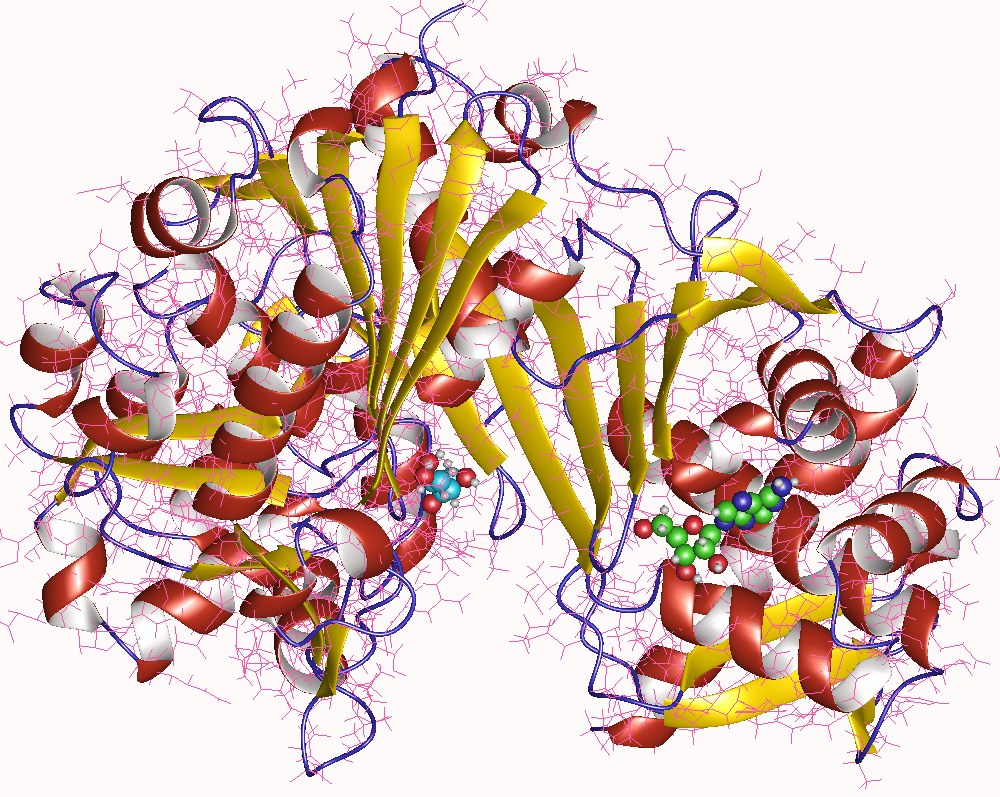
- D-xylulokinase monomer, Human

Identifiers
- EC no.: 2.7.1.17
- CAS no.: 9030-58-4

Databases
- IntEnz: IntEnz view
- BRENDA: BRENDA entry
- ExPASy: NiceZyme view
- KEGG: KEGG entry
- MetaCyc: metabolic pathway
- PRIAM: profile
- PDB structures: RCSB PDB PDBe PDBsum
- Gene Ontology: AmiGO / QuickGO
Search
- PMC: articles
- PubMed: articles
- NCBI: proteins

Xylulokinase (EC 2.7.1.17) is an enzyme that catalyzes the chemical reaction

ATP +
D-xylulose
ADP +
D-xylulose 5-phosphate

It was first characterised from Pasteurella pestis and Lactobacillus pentosus and converts the pentose sugar, D-xylulose, to D-xylulose 5-phosphate by transferring a phosphate group from the cofactor, adenosine triphosphate (ATP), which is converted to adenosine diphosphate (ADP). The enzyme is also found in mammalian liver, where it is an important component of carbohydrate metabolism.

This enzyme is a transferase, specifically one transferring phosphorus-containing groups (phosphotransferases) with an alcohol group as acceptor. The systematic name of this enzyme class is ATP:D-xylulose 5-phosphotransferase. Other names in common use include xylulokinase (phosphorylating), and D-xylulokinase.

== Structural studies ==
As of late 2007, two structures have been solved for this class of enzymes, with PDB accession codes PDB: 2ITM and PDB: 2NLX.

== Applications ==
=== Hydrogen production ===
In 2014 a low-temperature 50 °C (122 °F), atmospheric-pressure enzyme-driven process to convert xylose into hydrogen with nearly 100% of the theoretical yield was announced. The process employs 13 enzymes, including xylulokinase.
