= D-xylose reductase =

Identifiers
- EC no.: 1.1.1.307

Databases
- BRENDA: enzyme data
- ExPASy: NiceZyme view
- KEGG: enzyme entry
- MetaCyc: metabolic pathway
- Rhea: reactions
- PDB structures: RCSB PDB PDBe PDBsum
Search
- PMC: articles
- PubMed: articles
- NCBI: proteins

D-xylose reductase (EC 1.1.1.307, XylR, XyrA, msXR, dsXR, monospecific xylose reductase, dual specific xylose reductase, NAD(P)H-dependent xylose reductase, xylose reductase) is an enzyme with systematic name xylitol:NAD(P)^{+} oxidoreductase. This enzyme catalyses the following chemical reaction

xylitol
+ NAD^{+}
H^{+}
H^{+}
D-xylose
+ NADH

Xylose reductase catalyses the initial reaction in the xylose utilization pathway. The enzyme can use nicotinamide adenine dinucleotide (NADH) or nicotinamide adenine dinucleotide phosphate (NADPH) as its cofactor.
