= L-Deoxyribose =

l-Deoxyribose
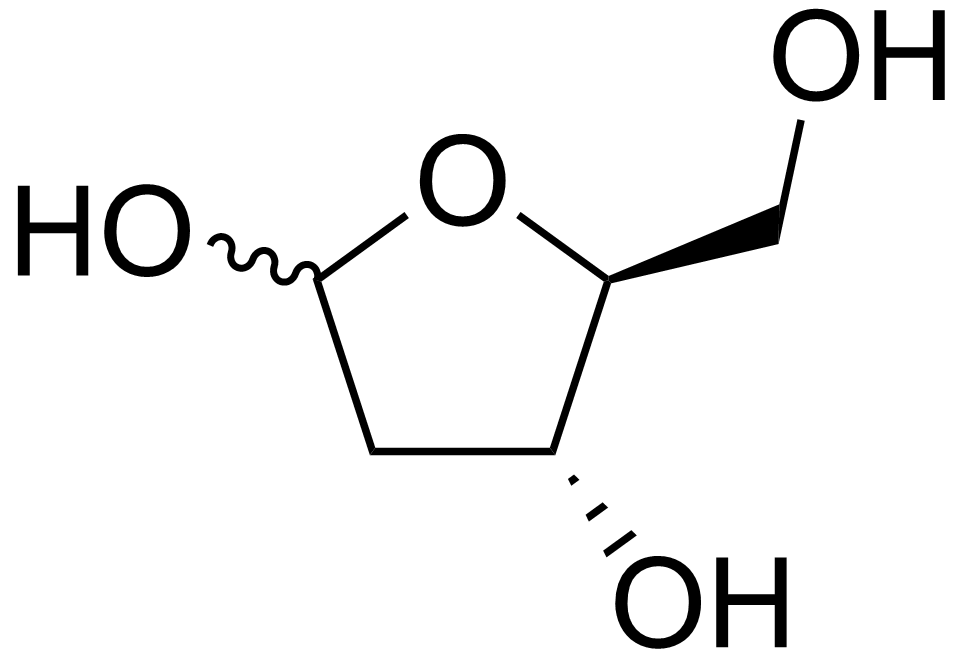

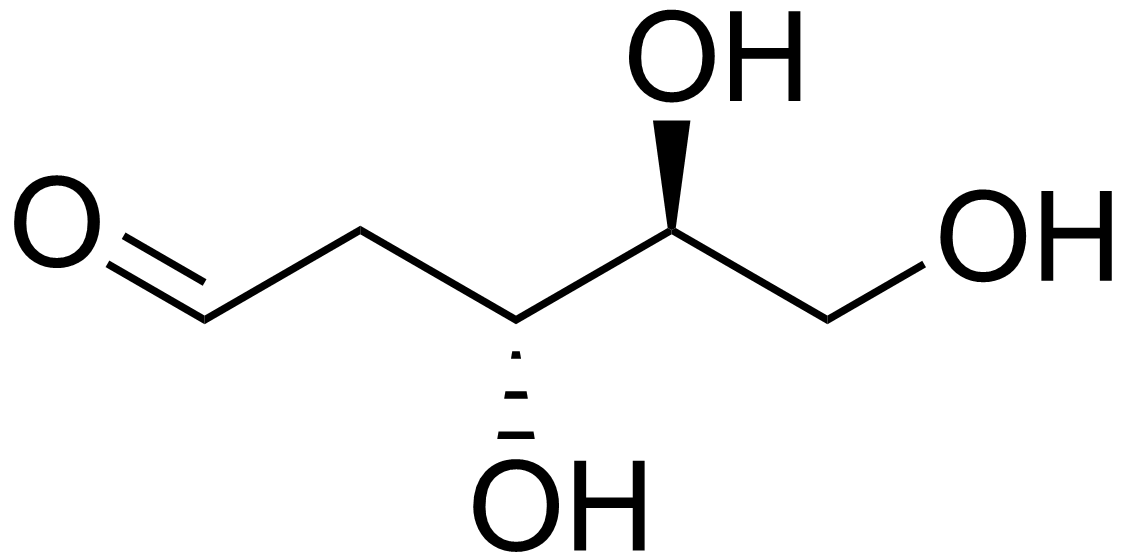

Names
- IUPAC name 2-Deoxy-l-ribose
- Systematic IUPAC name (3R,4S)-3,4,5-Trihydroxypentanal; 2-Deoxy-l-erythro-pentose
- Other names 2-Deoxy-l-ribose; l-2-Deoxyribose

Identifiers
CAS Number	18546-37-7
3D model (JSmol)	Interactive image; hemiacetal: Interactive image
ChemSpider	5362530; 8031184 hemiacetal
ECHA InfoCard	100.131.283
PubChem CID	6994527; 9855484 hemiacetal
CompTox Dashboard (EPA)	DTXSID50939972
- InChI: InChI=1S/C5H10O4/c6-2-1-4(8)5(9)3-7/h2,4-5,7-9H,1,3H2/t4-,5+/m1/s1 Key: ASJSAQIRZKANQN-UHNVWZDZSA-N; InChI=1/C5H10O4/c6-2-1-4(8)5(9)3-7/h2,4-5,7-9H,1,3H2/t4-,5+/m1/s1 Key: ASJSAQIRZKANQN-UHNVWZDZBB; hemiacetal: InChI=1/C5H10O4/c6-2-4-3(7)1-5(8)9-4/h3-8H,1-2H2/t3-,4+,5?/m1/s1 Key: PDWIQYODPROSQH-OVEKKEMJBQ; hemiacetal: InChI=1S/C5H10O4/c6-2-4-3(7)1-5(8)9-4/h3-8H,1-2H2/t3-,4+,5?/m1/s1 Key: PDWIQYODPROSQH-OVEKKEMJSA-N
- SMILES: O=CC[C@@H](O)[C@@H](O)CO; hemiacetal: OC[C@@H]1OC(O)C[C@H]1O

Properties
Chemical formula	C_{5}H_{10}O_{4}
Molar mass	134.131 g·mol^{−1}
Appearance	White solid
- Except where otherwise noted, data are given for materials in their standard state (at 25 °C [77 °F], 100 kPa). verify (what is ?) Infobox references

l-Deoxyribose is an organic compound with formula C_{5}H_{10}O_{4}. It is a synthetic monosaccharide, a stereoisomer (mirror image) of the natural compound d-deoxyribose.

l-Deoxyribose can be synthesized from d-galactose. It has been used in chemical research, e.g. in the synthesis of mirror-image DNA.
