= Alfred Baring Garrod =

English physician

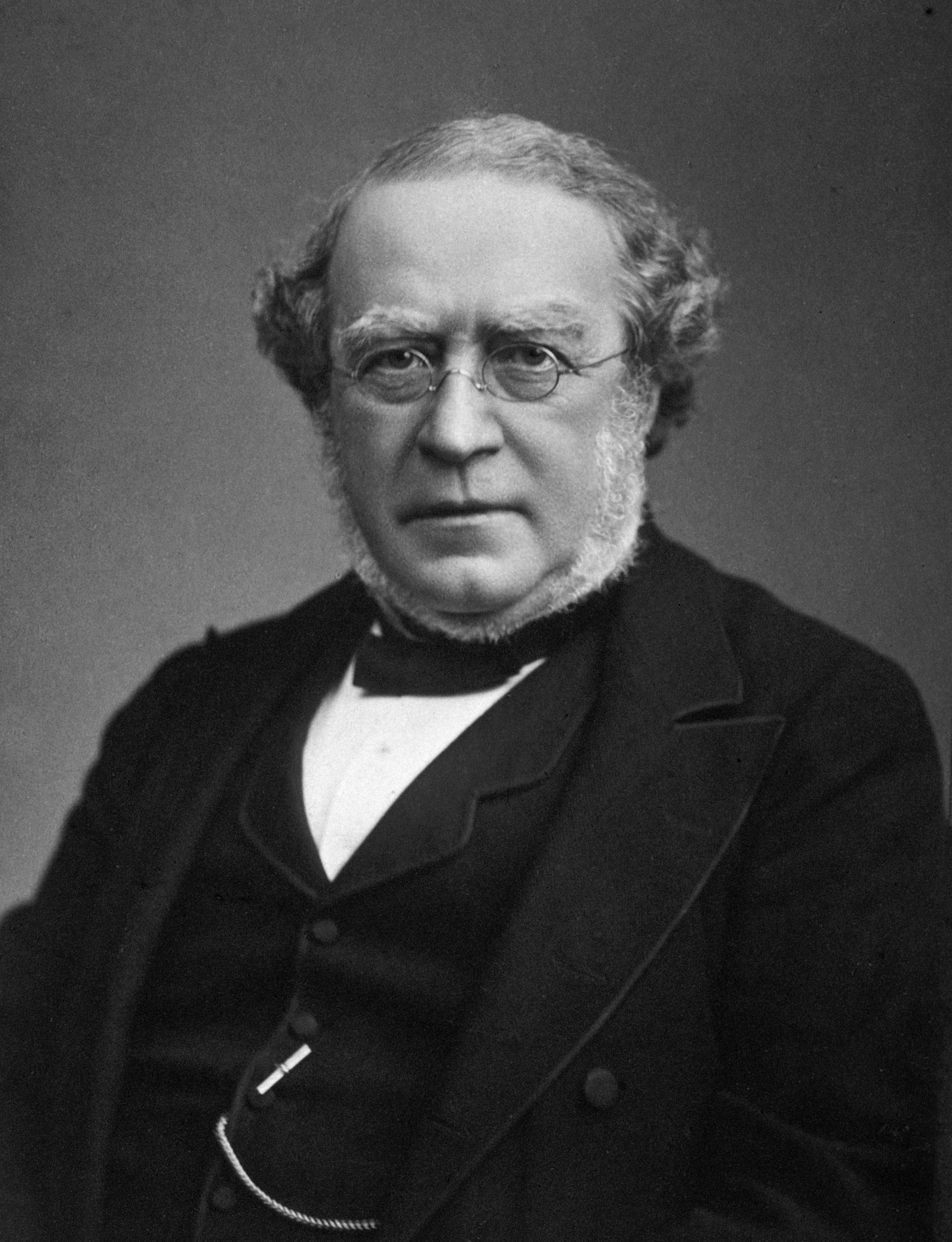
- Alfred Baring Garrod
- Born: 3 May 1819; Ipswich, England
- Died: 28 December 1907 (aged 88)
- Education: Ipswich Hospital
- Known for: uric acid associated with gout
- Scientific career
- Workplaces: University College Hospital

Sir Alfred Baring Garrod FRS (3 May 1819 – 28 December 1907) was an English physician.

Garrod was born in Ipswich, the son of Robert and Sarah (née Ennew) Garrod. He initially apprenticed at Ipswich Hospital, and later moved to University College Hospital, where he earned his medical doctorate in 1843. Afterwards he was an assistant at West London Hospital and a physician at the Aldersgate Dispensary. In 1849, he was appointed full physician at University College Hospital, and in 1863 became a professor of materia medica and therapeutics at King's College Hospital. In 1874, he left the hospital to become an honorary Fellow and consultant physician to the college.

In 1848, Garrod had discovered an abnormal increase of uric acid in the blood of patients with gout, and was the first to propose lithium as a remedy for the disorder. He recommended lithium as a treatment for mental illness, and hypothesized that gout could be a cause of mood disorders such as mania and depression. He is also credited for coining the term "rheumatoid arthritis".

In 1857 Garrod delivered the Goulstonian Lectures to the Royal College of Physicians. In 1858, he was elected a Fellow of the Royal Society.

In 1860, he was elected president of the Medical Society of London. In 1883 he gave the Lumleian Lectures. In 1887 he was knighted as "Sir Alfred Baring Garrod", and in 1890 was appointed "Physician Extraordinary" to Queen Victoria.

On his death in 1907 he was buried in the Great Northern cemetery, Southgate, Middlesex. He had married Elizabeth Ann Colchester of Ipswich; they had six children. Two of his sons were zoologist Alfred Henry Garrod (1846–1879) and physician Archibald Edward Garrod (1857–1936).

== Selected writings ==
- "Observations on the blood and urine of gout, rheumatism and Bright's disease"; Medical Chirurgical Transactions 1848;31:83.
- "The nature and treatment of gout and rheumatic gout"; London: Walton and Maberly, 1859.
- "A treatise on gout and rheumatic gout (rheumatoid arthritis)"; 3rd edn. London: Longman Green, 1876.
