= Gluconokinase =

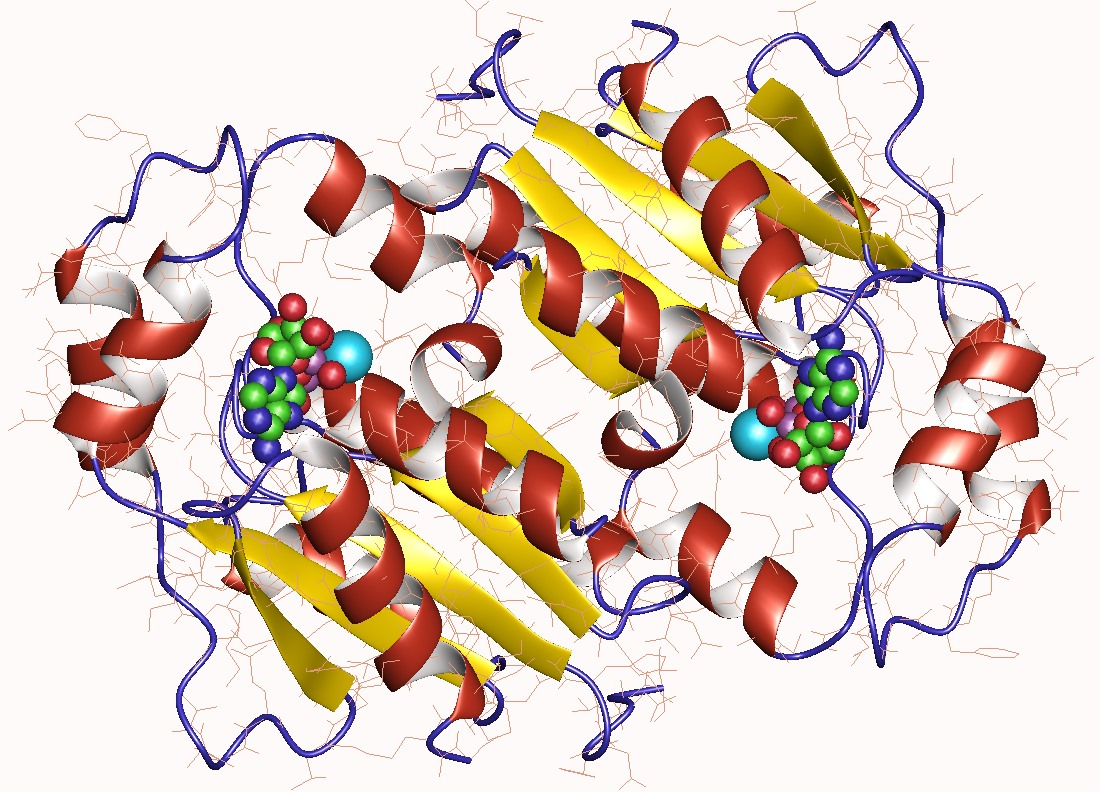
- Gluconokinase homodimer, E.Coli

Identifiers
- EC no.: 2.7.1.12
- CAS no.: 9030-55-1

Databases
- IntEnz: IntEnz view
- BRENDA: BRENDA entry
- ExPASy: NiceZyme view
- KEGG: KEGG entry
- MetaCyc: metabolic pathway
- PRIAM: profile
- PDB structures: RCSB PDB PDBe PDBsum
- Gene Ontology: AmiGO / QuickGO
Search
- PMC: articles
- PubMed: articles
- NCBI: proteins

Gluconokinase (EC 2.7.1.12) is an enzyme that catalyzes the chemical reaction

ATP +
gluconic acid
ADP +
6-phosphogluconic acid

The enzyme characterised from yeast and Escherichia coli converts the hexose sugar, D-gluconic acid, to 6-phospho-D-gluconic acid by transferring a phosphate group from the cofactor, adenosine triphosphate (ATP), which is converted to adenosine diphosphate (ADP). The enzyme is also found in mammalian kidney and Pseudomonas fluorescens.

This enzyme is a transferase, specifically one transferring phosphorus-containing groups (phosphotransferases) with an alcohol group as acceptor. The systematic name of this enzyme class is ATP:D-gluconate 6-phosphotransferase. Other names in common use include gluconokinase (phosphorylating), and gluconate kinase.

== Structural studies ==
As of late 2007, 6 structures have been solved for this class of enzymes, with PDB accession codes PDB: 1KNQ, PDB: 1KO1, PDB: 1KO4, PDB: 1KO5, PDB: 1KO8, and PDB: 1KOF.
