= Alfred Henry Garrod =

English vertebrate zoologist

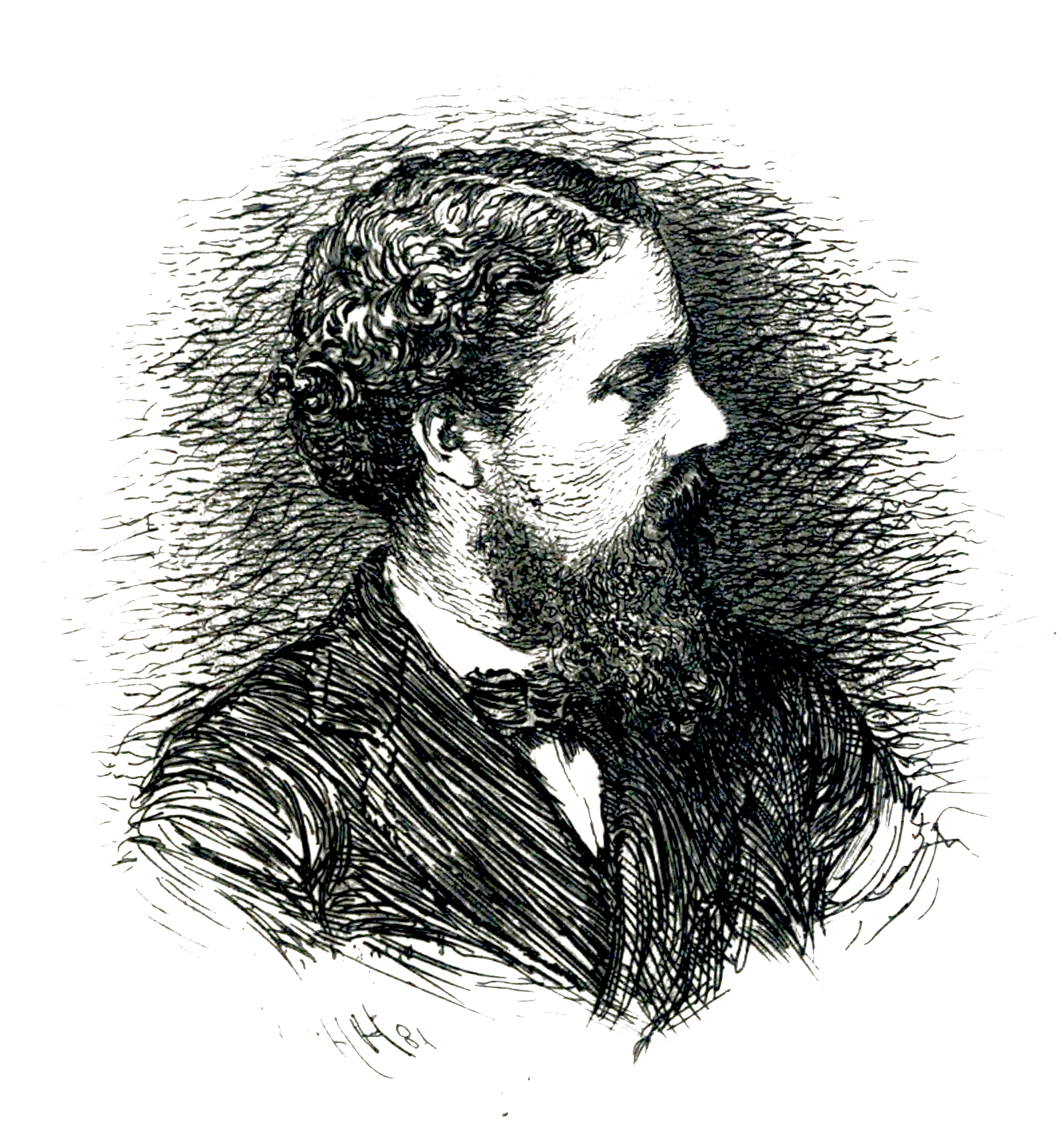
- Alfred Henry Garrod, 1881
- Born: May 18, 1846; London
- Died: October 17, 1879 (aged 33); London
- Occupation: zoologist

Alfred Henry Garrod FRS (May 18, 1846 – October 17, 1879) was an English vertebrate zoologist.

Garrod was born in London, the eldest son of Sir Alfred Baring Garrod (1819–1907), a physician at King's College Hospital, who discovered the abnormal uric acid metabolism associated with gout. He was also the eldest brother of Archibald Edward Garrod (1857–1936), an English physician who pioneered the field of inborn errors of metabolism.

== Academic history ==
He attended University College School and King's College London before entering Caius College, Cambridge in 1867. Migrating to St John's College, he gained his B.A. with a first-class in the Natural Sciences Tripos and obtained a college fellowship – the first in his subject – in 1873.

From 1874 to 1879, Garrod taught comparative anatomy at King's College London. In 1875, he was nominated as the Fullerian Professor of Physiology and Comparative Anatomy at the Royal Institution, a position he held until 1878. Shortly after he was aggregated as a fellow to the Royal Society in 1876. Garrod's main scientific interests were bird and ruminant anatomy.

He also was a contributor to the description of the specimens obtained from the Challenger expedition (1872-1876).

In 1881, William Alexander Forbes named the genus Garrodia for the grey-backed storm petrel in honour of Alfred Garrod.

Academic offices
Preceded by William Rutherford	Fullerian Professor of Physiology; 1875–1878	Succeeded by Edward Albert Sharpey-Schafer
