= L-xylose 1-dehydrogenase =

Identifiers
- EC no.: 1.1.1.113
- CAS no.: 37250-44-5

Databases
- IntEnz: IntEnz view
- BRENDA: BRENDA entry
- ExPASy: NiceZyme view
- KEGG: KEGG entry
- MetaCyc: metabolic pathway
- PRIAM: profile
- PDB structures: RCSB PDB PDBe PDBsum
- Gene Ontology: AmiGO / QuickGO
Search
- PMC: articles
- PubMed: articles
- NCBI: proteins

In enzymology, L-xylose 1-dehydrogenase (EC 1.1.1.113) is an enzyme that catalyzes the chemical reaction

L-Xylofuranose
+ NADP^{+}
H^{+}
H^{+}
L-Xylono-1,4-lactone
+ NADPH

The two substrates of this enzyme are L-xylose and oxidised nicotinamide adenine dinucleotide phosphate (NADP^{+}). Its products are L-xylono-1,4-lactone, reduced NADPH, and a proton.

This enzyme belongs to the family of oxidoreductases, specifically those acting on the CH-OH group of donor with NAD^{+} or NADP^{+} as acceptor. The systematic name of this enzyme class is L-xylose:NADP^{+} 1-oxidoreductase. Other names in common use include L-xylose dehydrogenase, and NADPH-xylose reductase.
