= Xylitol =

Natural sweetener

- Xylitol

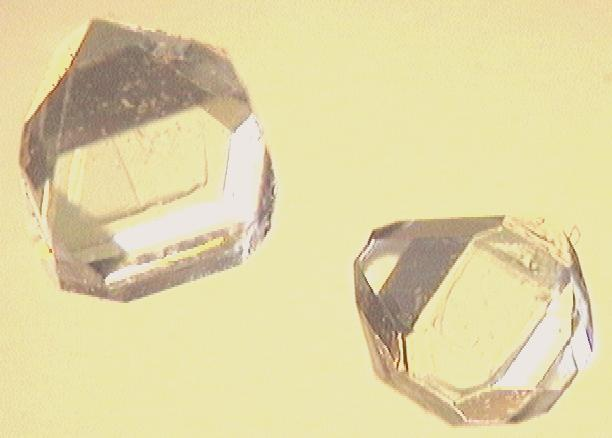
- Xylitol crystals

Names
Pronunciation	/ˈzaɪlɪtɒl/
- IUPAC name meso-Xylitol
- Systematic IUPAC name (2R,3r,4S)-Pentane-1,2,3,4,5-pentol
- Other names: (2R,3r,4S)-Pentane-1,2,3,4,5-pentaol (not recommended); (2R,3r,4S)-1,2,3,4,5-Pentahydroxypentane; Xylite

Identifiers
CAS Number	87-99-0
3D model (JSmol)	Interactive image
ChEMBL	ChEMBL96783
ChemSpider	6646
ECHA InfoCard	100.001.626
E number	E967 (glazing agents, ...)
KEGG	C00379
PubChem CID	6912
UNII	VCQ006KQ1E
CompTox Dashboard (EPA)	DTXSID7042514
- InChI: InChI=1S/C5H12O5/c6-1-3(8)5(10)4(9)2-7/h3-10H,1-2H2/t3-,4+,5+ Key: HEBKCHPVOIAQTA-SCDXWVJYSA-N
- SMILES: OC[C@@H](O)[C@H](O)[C@@H](O)CO

Properties
Chemical formula	C_{5}H_{12}O_{5}
Molar mass	152.146 g·mol^{−1}
Density	1.52 g/cm^{3}
Melting point	92 to 96 °C (198 to 205 °F; 365 to 369 K)
Boiling point	345.39 °C (653.70 °F; 618.54 K) predicted value using Adapted Stein & Brown method
Solubility in water	168 g/100 g

Hazards
NFPA 704 (fire diamond)	1 1 0

Related compounds
Related alkanes	Pentane
- Except where otherwise noted, data are given for materials in their standard state (at 25 °C [77 °F], 100 kPa). verify (what is ?) Infobox references

Xylitol is an organic compound with the formula HOCH(CH(OH)CH_{2}OH)_{2}. Two other isomeric sugar alcohols exist. It is a colorless or white crystalline solid. It is classified as a polyalcohol and a sugar alcohol, specifically an alditol. Of the common sugar alcohols, only sorbitol is more soluble in water.

It is sometimes also called birch sugar as it can be extracted from birch wood. It should not be confused with birch syrup, which is made from birch sap and contains only trace amounts of xylitol.

The name derives from Ancient Greek: ξύλον, xyl[on] 'wood', with the suffix -itol used to denote it being a sugar alcohol.

Xylitol is used as a food additive and sugar substitute. Its European Union code number is E967. Replacing sugar with xylitol in food products may promote better dental health, but evidence is lacking on whether xylitol itself prevents dental cavities. In the United States, xylitol is used as a common sugar substitute, and is considered to be safe for humans.

== History ==
Emil Fischer, a German chemist, and his assistant Rudolf Stahel isolated a new compound from beech wood chips in September 1890 and named it Xylit, after the Greek word for wood. The following year, the French chemist M. G. Bertrand isolated xylitol syrup by processing wheat and oat straw. Sugar rationing during World War II led to an interest in sugar substitutes. Interest in xylitol and other polyols became intense, leading to their characterization and manufacturing methods.

== Structure, production, commerce ==
Xylitol is one of three 5-carbon sugar alcohols. The others are arabitol and ribitol. These three compounds differ in the stereochemistry of the three secondary alcohol groups.

5-carbon sugar alcohols
Arabitol

Ribitol

Xylitol

Xylitol occurs naturally in small amounts in plums, strawberries, cauliflower, and pumpkin; humans and many other animals make trace amounts during metabolism of carbohydrates. Unlike most sugar alcohols, xylitol is achiral. Most other isomers of pentane-1,2,3,4,5-pentol are chiral, but xylitol has a plane of symmetry.

Industrial production starts with lignocellulosic biomass from which xylan is extracted; raw biomass materials include hardwoods, softwoods, and agricultural waste from processing maize, wheat, or rice. The mixture is hydrolyzed with acid to give xylose. The xylose is purified by chromatography. Purified xylose is catalytically hydrogenated into xylitol using a Raney nickel catalyst. The conversion changes the sugar (xylose, an aldehyde) into the primary alcohol, xylitol.

Xylitol can also be obtained by industrial fermentation, but this methodology is not as economical as the acid hydrolysis/chromatography route described above. Fermentation is affected by bacteria, fungi, or yeast, especially Candida tropicalis. According to the US Department of Energy, xylitol production by fermentation from discarded biomass is one of the most valuable renewable chemicals for commerce, forecast to be a US $1.41 billion industry by 2025.

== Uses ==
Xylitol is used as a sugar substitute in such manufactured products as drugs, dietary supplements, confections, toothpaste, and chewing gum, but is not a common household sweetener. Xylitol has negligible effects on blood sugar because its assimilation and metabolism are independent of insulin. It is approved as a food additive and sugar substitute in the United States.

Xylitol is also found as an additive to saline solution for nasal irrigation and has been suggested to be effective in improving symptoms of chronic sinusitis.

However the evidence surrounding the effectiveness of xylitol for nasal irrigation remains doubtful.

Xylitol can also be incorporated into fabrics to produce a cooling fabric. When moisture, such as sweat, comes into contact with the xylitol embedded in the fabric, it produces a cooling sensation.

== Food properties ==
=== Nutrition, taste, and cooking ===
Humans absorb xylitol more slowly than sucrose, and xylitol supplies 40% fewer calories than an equal mass of sucrose.

Xylitol has about the same sweetness as sucrose, but is sweeter than similar compounds like sorbitol and mannitol.

Xylitol is stable enough to be used in baking, but, because xylitol and other polyols are more heat-stable, they do not caramelise as sugars do. Sugars and polyols lower the freezing point of foods such as ice-cream, but xylitol does so excessively, requiring thickeners to keep the ice-cream from being too soft.

=== Food risks ===
Normal levels of consumption by humans have not been shown to pose serious health risks in most humans. The European Food Safety Authority has not set a limit on daily intake of xylitol. Due to the adverse laxative effect that all polyols have on the digestive system in high doses, xylitol is banned from soft drinks in the European Union. Similarly, due to a 1985 report by the E.U. Scientific Committee on Food which states that "ingesting 50 g a day of xylitol can cause diarrhea", tabletop sweeteners (as well as other products containing xylitol) are required to display the warning "Excessive consumption may induce laxative effects".

=== Metabolism ===
Xylitol has 2.4 kilocalories of food energy per gram (10 kilojoules per gram) according to U.S. and E.U. food-labeling regulations. The real value can vary depending on metabolic factors.

The liver primarily metabolizes absorbed xylitol. The main metabolic route in humans occurs in the cytoplasm via nonspecific NAD-dependent dehydrogenase (polyol dehydrogenase), which transforms xylitol to D-xylulose. Specific xylulokinase phosphorylates it to D-xylulose-5-phosphate, which then goes into the pentose phosphate pathway for further processing.

About 50% of ingested xylitol is absorbed via the intestines. In humans, 50–75% of the xylitol not absorbed in the gut is fermented by gut bacteria into short-chain organic acids and gases, potentially leading to flatulence. Any remnant unabsorbed xylitol that escapes fermentation is excreted unchanged, mostly in feces; less than 2 g of xylitol out of every 100 g ingested is excreted via urine.

Xylitol ingestion also increases motilin secretion, which may be related to the ability of xylitol to cause diarrhea. The less-digestible but fermentable nature of xylitol also contributes to constipation-relieving effects.

== Health effects ==
=== Dental care ===
A 2015 Cochrane review of ten studies between 1991 and 2014 suggested a positive effect in reducing tooth decay of xylitol-containing fluoride toothpastes when compared to fluoride-only toothpaste, but there was insufficient evidence to determine whether other xylitol-containing products can prevent tooth decay in infants, children or adults. Subsequent reviews support the belief that xylitol can suppress the growth of pathogenic Streptococcus in the mouth, thereby reducing dental cavities and gingivitis, although there is concern that swallowed xylitol may cause intestinal dysbiosis. A 2022 review suggested that xylitol-containing chewing gum decreases plaque, but xylitol-containing candy does not.

=== Earache ===
In 2011, EFSA "concluded that there was not enough evidence to support" the claim that xylitol-sweetened gum could prevent middle-ear infections (acute otitis media; AOM). A 2016 review indicated that xylitol in chewing gum or a syrup may have a moderate effect in preventing AOM in healthy children. It may be an alternative to conventional therapies (such as antibiotics) to lower risk of earache in healthy children – reducing risk of occurrence by 25% – although there is no definitive proof that it could be used as a therapy for earache.

=== Diabetes ===
In 2011, EFSA approved a marketing claim that foods or beverages containing xylitol or similar sugar replacers cause lower blood glucose and lower insulin responses compared to sugar-containing foods or drinks. Xylitol products are used as sucrose substitutes for weight control, as xylitol has 40% fewer calories than sucrose (2.4 kcal/g compared to 4.0 kcal/g for sucrose). The glycemic index (GI) of xylitol is only 7% of the GI for glucose.

== Adverse effects ==
=== Humans ===
When ingested at high doses, xylitol and other polyols may cause gastrointestinal discomfort, including flatulence, diarrhea, and irritable bowel syndrome (see Metabolism above); some people experience the adverse effects at lower doses. Xylitol has a lower laxation threshold than some sugar alcohols but is more easily tolerated than mannitol and sorbitol.

Increased xylitol consumption can increase oxalate, calcium, and phosphate excretion to urine (termed oxaluria, calciuria, and phosphaturia, respectively). These are known risk factors for kidney stone disease, but despite that, xylitol has not been linked to kidney disease in humans.

=== Dogs and other animals ===
Xylitol is poisonous to dogs. Ingesting 100 milligrams of xylitol per kilogram of body weight (mg/kg bw) causes dogs to experience a dose-dependent insulin release; depending on the dose it can result in life-threatening hypoglycemia. Hypoglycemic symptoms of xylitol toxicity may arise as quickly as 30 to 60 minutes after ingestion. Vomiting is a common first symptom, which can be followed by tiredness and ataxia. At doses above 500 mg/kg bw, liver failure is likely and may result in coagulopathies like disseminated intravascular coagulation. It is also poisonous to ferrets.

Xylitol is safe for rhesus macaques, horses, and rats.

A 2018 study suggests that xylitol is safe for cats in doses of up to 1000 mg/kg; however, this study was performed on only 6 cats and should not be considered definitive. The American Society for the Prevention of Cruelty to Animals has never issued any warning about xylitol and cats. A 2022 article by the organisation explicitly lists xylitol as non-toxic.

== See also ==
- Aspartame – Artificial non-saccharide sweetener
- L-xylulose reductase – Enzyme
- Xylonic acid
