= Xylulose =

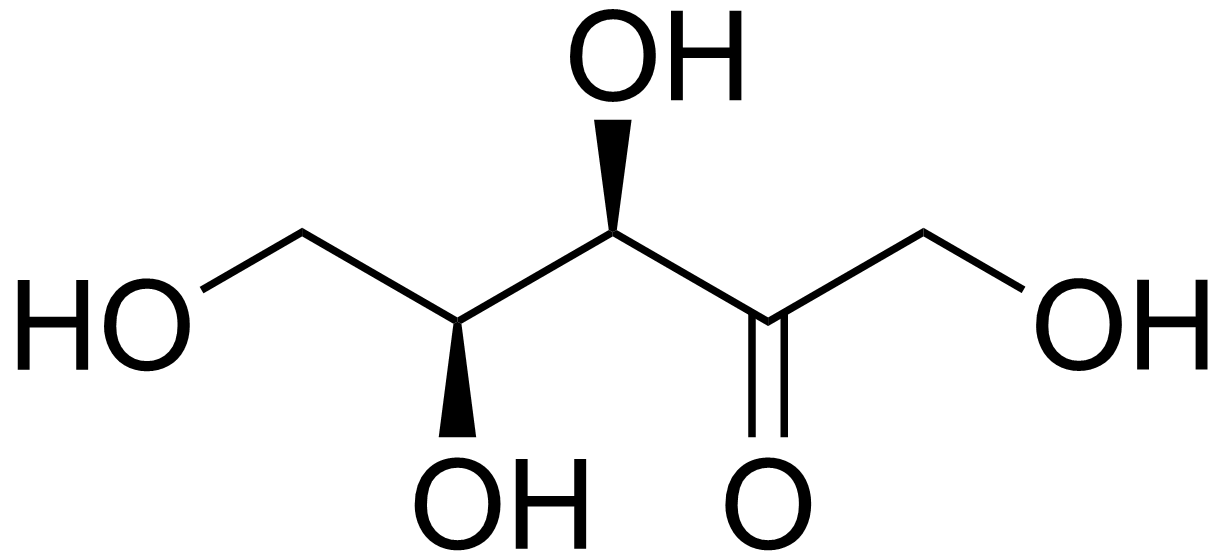

Names
- IUPAC name L-threo-Pent-2-ulose
- Systematic IUPAC name (3R,4S)-1,3,4,5-Tetrahydroxypentan-2-one
- Other names threo-Pentulose threo-2-PentuloseL-Xylulose

Identifiers
CAS Number	5962-29-8 (D/L); 551-84-8 (D); 527-50-4 (L)
3D model (JSmol)	Interactive image
ChEBI	CHEBI:17399
ChemSpider	20892
PubChem CID	22253
UNII	9N4LZL67SA; YSC9WAF8X1 (D); DL1M07LQ7A (L)
CompTox Dashboard (EPA)	DTXSID201315618
- InChI: InChI=1S/C5H10O5/c6-1-3(8)5(10)4(9)2-7/h3,5-8,10H,1-2H2/t3-,5+/m0/s1 Key: ZAQJHHRNXZUBTE-WVZVXSGGSA-N; InChI=1S/C5H10O5/c6-1-3(8)5(10)4(9)2-7/h3,5-8,10H,1-2H2/t3-,5+/m0/s1; Key: ZAQJHHRNXZUBTE-WVZVXSGGSA-N
- SMILES: C([C@@H]([C@H](C(=O)CO)O)O)O

Properties
Chemical formula	C_{5}H_{10}O_{5}
Molar mass	150.130 g·mol^{−1}
Appearance	colorless syrup
- Except where otherwise noted, data are given for materials in their standard state (at 25 °C [77 °F], 100 kPa). verify (what is ?) Infobox references

Xylulose is a ketopentose, a monosaccharide containing five carbon atoms, and including a ketone functional group. It has the chemical formula C_{5}H_{10}O_{5}. In nature, it occurs in both the L- and D-enantiomers. 1-Deoxyxylulose is a precursor to terpenes via the DOXP pathway.

== Pathology ==
L-Xylulose accumulates in the urine in patients with pentosuria, due to a deficiency in L-xylulose reductase. Since L-xylulose is a reducing sugar like D-glucose, pentosuria patients have been wrongly diagnosed in the past to be diabetic.
