= L-arabinose operon =

Gene regulation group

The L-arabinose operon, also called the ara or araBAD operon, is an operon required for the breakdown of the five-carbon sugar L-arabinose in Escherichia coli. The L-arabinose operon contains three structural genes: araB, araA, araD (collectively known as araBAD), which encode for three metabolic enzymes that are required for the metabolism of L-arabinose. AraB (ribulokinase), AraA (an isomerase), and AraD (an epimerase) produced by these genes catalyse conversion of L-arabinose to an intermediate of the pentose phosphate pathway, D-xylulose-5-phosphate.

The structural genes of the L-arabinose operon are transcribed from a common promoter into a single transcript, a mRNA. The expression of the L-arabinose operon is controlled as a single unit by the product of regulatory gene araC and the catabolite activator protein (CAP)-cAMP complex. The regulator protein AraC is sensitive to the level of arabinose and plays a dual role as both an activator in the presence of arabinose and a repressor in the absence of arabinose to regulate the expression of araBAD. AraC protein not only controls the expression of araBAD but also auto-regulates its own expression at high AraC levels.

== Structure ==
L-arabinose operon is composed of structural genes and regulatory regions including the operator region (araO_{1}, araO_{2}) and the initiator region (araI_{1}, araI_{2}). The structural genes, araB, araA and araD, encode enzymes for L-arabinose catabolism. There is also a CAP binding site where CAP-cAMP complex binds to and facilitates catabolite repression, and results in positive regulation of araBAD when the cell is starved of glucose.

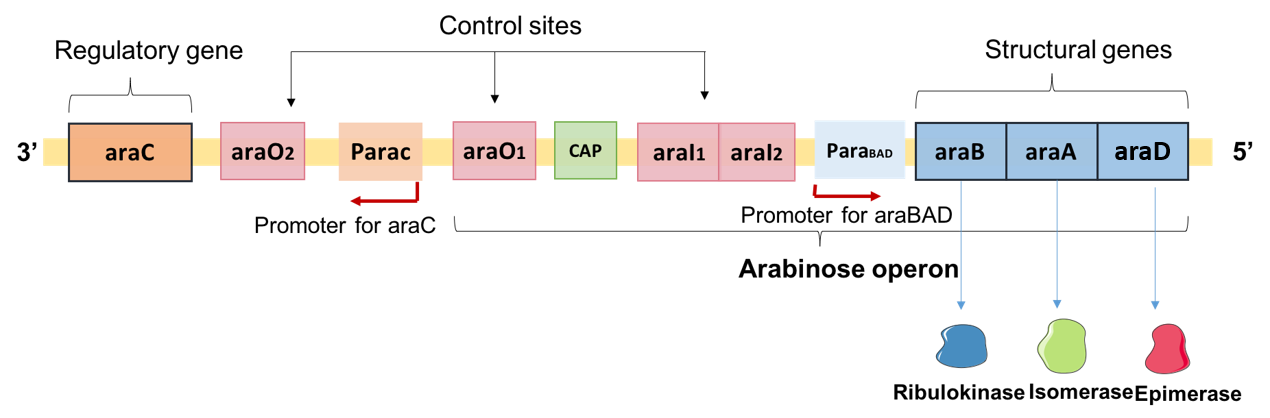
Structure of L-arabinose operon of E. coli.

The regulatory gene, araC, is located upstream of the L-arabinose operon and encodes the arabinose-responsive regulatory protein AraC. Both araC and araBAD have a discrete promoter where RNA polymerase binds and initiates transcription. araBAD and araC are transcribed in opposite directions from the araBAD promoter (P_{BAD}) and araC promoter (P_{C}) respectively.

== Function ==
- araA encodes L-arabinose isomerase, which catalyses isomerization between L-arabinose and L-ribulose.
- araB encodes ribulokinase, which catalyses phosphorylation of L-ribulose to form L-ribulose-5-phosphate.
- araD encodes L-ribulose-5-phosphate 4-epimerase, which catalyses epimerization between L-ribulose 5-phosphate and D-xylulose-5-phosphate.

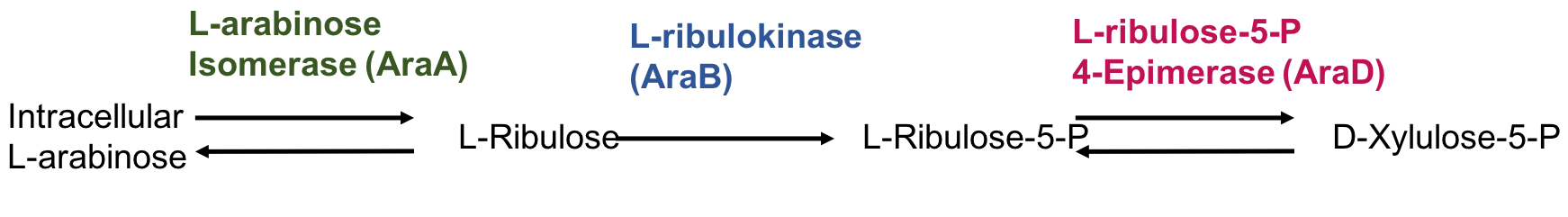
Metabolic pathway of L-arabinose via the action of three enzymes, which are encoded by the araBAD operon.

Catabolism of arabinose in E. coli
Substrate	Enzyme(s)	Function	Reversible	Product
L-arabinose	AraA	Isomerase	Yes	L-ribulose
L-ribulose	AraB	Ribulokinase	No	L-ribulose-5-phosphate
L-ribulose-5-phosphate	AraD	Epimerase	Yes	D-xylulose-5-phosphate

Both L-ribulose 5-phosphate and D-xylulose-5-phosphate are metabolites of the pentose phosphate pathway, which links the metabolism of 5-carbon sugars to that of 6-carbon sugars.

== Regulation ==
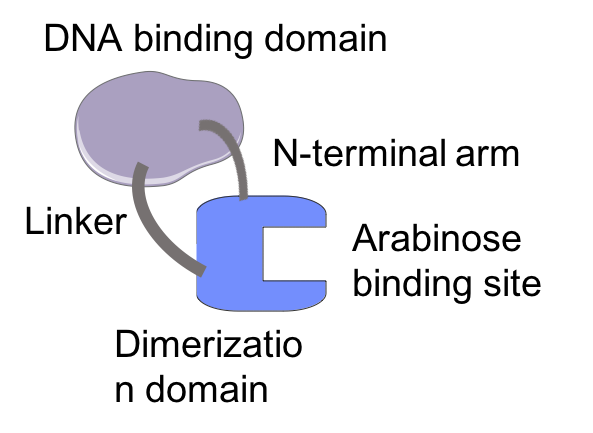
Structure of AraC monomer

The L-arabinose system is not only under the control of CAP-cAMP activator, but also positively or negatively regulated through binding of AraC protein. AraC functions as a homodimer, which can control transcription of araBAD through interaction with the operator and the initiator region on L-arabinose operon. Each AraC monomer is composed of two domains including a DNA binding domain and a dimerisation domain. The dimerisation domain is responsible for arabinose-binding. AraC undergoes conformational change upon arabinose-binding, in which, it has two distinct conformations. The conformation is purely determined by the binding of allosteric inducer arabinose.

AraC can also negatively autoregulate its own expression when the concentration of AraC becomes too high. AraC synthesis is repressed through binding of dimeric AraC to the operator region (araO_{1}).

=== Negative regulation of araBAD ===
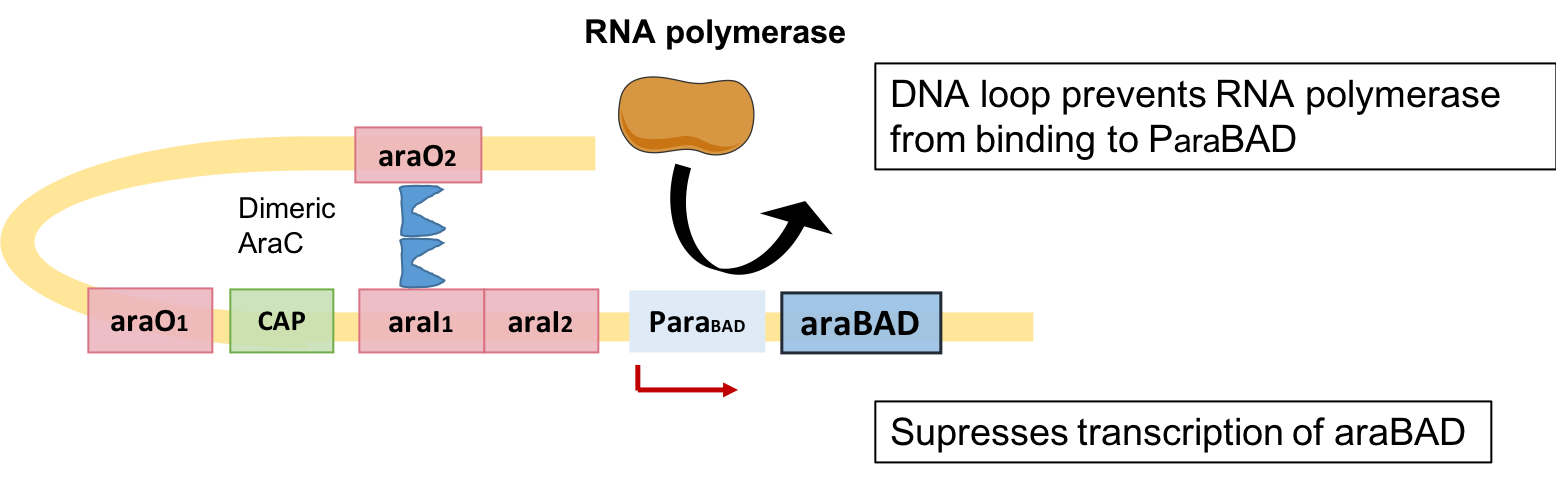
Negative regulation of L-arabinose operon via AraC protein

When arabinose is absent, cells do not need the ara_{BAD} products for breaking down arabinose. Therefore, dimeric AraC acts as a repressor: one monomer binds to the operator of the araBAD gene (araO_{2}), another monomer binds to a distant DNA half site known as araI_{1}. This leads to the formation of a DNA loop. This orientation blocks RNA polymerase from binding to the araBAD promoter. Therefore, transcription of structural gene araBAD is inhibited.

=== Positive regulation of araBAD ===
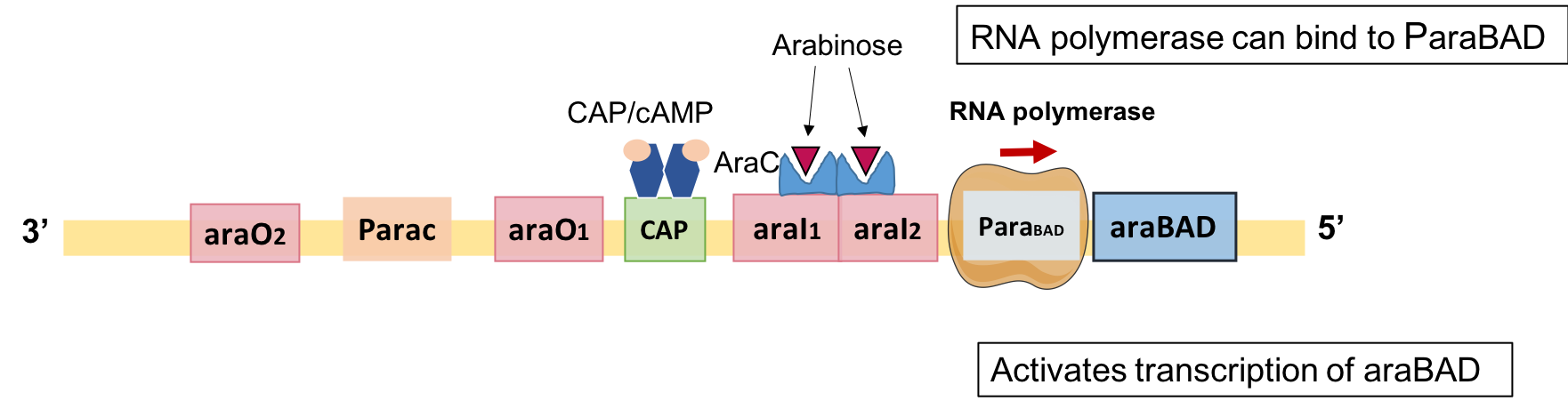
Positive regulation of L-arabinose operon via dimeric AraC and CAP/cAMP

Expression of the araBAD operon is activated in the absence of glucose and in the presence of arabinose. When arabinose is present, both AraC and CAP work together and function as activators.

==== Via AraC ====
AraC acts as an activator in the presence of arabinose. AraC undergoes a conformational change when arabinose binds to the dimerization domain of AraC. As a result, the AraC-arabinose complex falls off from araO_{2} and breaks the DNA loop. Hence, it is more energetically favourable for AraC-arabinose to bind to two adjacent DNA half sites: araI_{1} and araI_{2} in the presence of arabinose. One of the monomers binds araI_{1}, the remaining monomer binds araI_{2} - in other words, binding of AraC to araI_{2} is allosterically induced by arabinose. One of the AraC monomers places near to the araBAD promoter in this configuration, which helps to recruit RNA polymerase to the promoter to initiate transcription.

==== Via CAP/cAMP (catabolite repression) ====
CAP act as a transcriptional activator only in the absence of E. coli's preferred sugar, glucose. When glucose is absent, high level of CAP protein/cAMP complex bind to CAP binding site, a site between araI_{1} and araO_{1}. Binding of CAP/cAMP is responsible for opening up the DNA loop between araI_{1} and araO_{2}, increasing the binding affinity of AraC protein for araI_{2} and thereby promoting RNA polymerase to bind to araBAD promoter to switch on the expression of the araBAD required for metabolising L-arabinose.

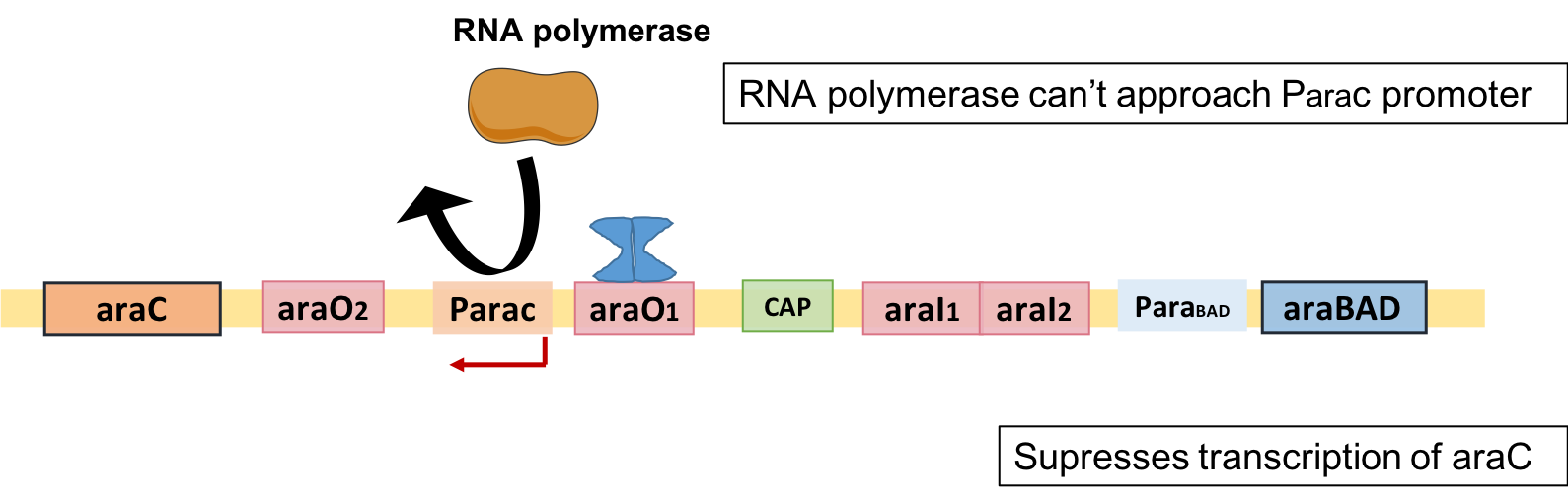
Autoregulation of araC expression

=== Autoregulation of AraC ===
The expression of araC is negatively regulated by its own protein product, AraC. The excess AraC binds to the operator of the araC gene, araO_{1}, at high AraC levels, which physically blocks the RNA polymerase from accessing the araC promoter. Therefore, the AraC protein inhibits its own expression at high concentrations.

== Use in protein expression system ==
The L-arabinose operon has been a focus for research in molecular biology since 1970, and has been investigated extensively at its genetic, biochemical, physiological and biotechnical levels. The L-arabinose operon has been commonly used in protein expression system, as the araBAD promoter can be used for producing targeted expression under tight regulation. By fusing the araBAD promoter to a gene of interest, the expression of the target gene can be solely regulated by arabinose: for example, the pGLO plasmid contains a green fluorescent protein gene under the control of the P_{BAD} promoter, allowing GFP production to be induced by arabinose.

== See also ==
- Operon
- Catabolism
- Catabolite repression

Other operon systems in E. coli:

- gal operon
- gab operon
- lac operon
- trp operon
