= Ribose repressor =

Ribose operon repressor

Identifiers
- Organism: Escherichia coli
- Symbol: rbsR
- Entrez: 948266
- RefSeq (Prot): NP_418209.1
- UniProt: P0ACQ0

Other data
- Chromosome: Genomic: 3.94 - 3.94 Mb
Search for
- Structures: Swiss-model
- Domains: InterPro

The Ribose repressor (RbsR) is a bacterial DNA-binding transcription repressor protein and a member of the LacI/GalR protein family. This group of proteins is known for controlling sugar-related metabolic pathways. Proteins in this family typically monitor nutrient availability by binding small metabolites and adjusting gene expression. Their regulatory activities allow bacteria to conserve energy by ensuring that specific pathways activate only when their substrates are present or when metabolic demands shift. In Escherichia coli, RbsR is responsible for the regulation of genes involved in D-ribose metabolism by affecting the transcription of the rbs operon genes. This operon also includes genes that activate ribose uptake and its subsequent conversion into intermediates for central metabolism, and RbsR is the main regulator that determines when these genes are expressed.

Aside from its role in carbohydrate metabolism, RbsR has been noted to interact with a broader range of pathways. It has also been referred to as a "global regulator" due to its ability to activate and repress genes in the purine nucleotide metabolism, thus linking it to one of the most fundamental biosynthetic pathways in the cell. In Bacillus subtilis, RbsR was shown to interact with Histidine-containing protein (HPr), an allosteric effector of the related LacI/GalR protein Catabolite Control Protein A (CcpA).

== Structure ==
RbsR is composed of two major functional domains that are found on opposite ends of the protein. The design is characteristic of the LacI/GalR family. This organization allows the RbsR to detect the presence of ribose and translate the signal into changes in DNA binding.

=== N-terminal DNA-binding domain ===
One of these parts is similar to the LacI DNA-binding structure, and is located in the N-terminus on the RbsR. It contains a helix-turn-helix (HTH) motif that facilitates binding to the operon as well as a total of four helices that support DNA binding and dimerization. The HTH motif is a well-studied structure that appears in many transcription factors, including common repressors and various eukaryotic transcriptional regulators. It consists of two alpha-helices connected by a short loop that provides the spacing needed for the second helix to enter the major groove of DNA. This binding is possible due to the hydrogen bonding between the amino acids in the protein and the nucleotides in the DNA. The arrangement of helices positions the recognition helix so that its amino acid side chains can form these interactions with the bases exposed in the major groove of the DNA.

=== C-terminal ligand-binding domain ===
The second portion is found in the C-terminal, where the ligand binding would occur. It expands to 272 residues and covers 80 percent of the protein. This area is also homologous to the periplasmic ribose-binding proteins (RBPs) whole sequence. RBPs are a part of the ATP-binding cassette and are able to bind to ribose and transport it. It would act as the first messenger when it binds to the ribosome, thereby resulting in a change in structure and function in the RbsR.

== Function ==
The primary function of RbsR is to regulate transcription of the rbs operon. This operon contains genes for ribose transport and ribokinase activity, making it essential for utilizing ribose as a carbon source. When RbsR is active, it is able to act as an off-switch for the ribosome binding site (rbs) operon by inhibiting the transcription process.

=== Repression in ribose-limited conditions ===
When ribose is scarce, RbsR binds tightly to the operator site located upstream of the rbs promoter. The operator is a binding site in prokaryotic DNA that is used by repressor proteins. When RbsR binds to the operator, it is physically blocking the RNA polymerase from accessing the promoter or from forming an open complex necessary to begin transcription. As a result, the genes that are responsible for ribose uptake and metabolism remain silent.

=== Activation when ribose is present ===
D-ribose structure that binds with the C-terminal of RbsR

As ribose becomes available, it binds to the C-terminal domain of RbsR. This interaction decreases the protein's the proteins affinity for DNA and allows it to detach from the operator and enabling transcription to proceed. This transition from repression to activation ensures that cells only produce ribose-utilizing proteins when the substrate is present.

=== Additional regulatory roles ===
RbsR has also been shown to influence the transcription of genes involved in purine metabolism. Purines, specifically adenine and guanine, play an essential role because these compounds are used in forming the nucleotides that make up DNA and RNA. They are also crucial for supplying cellular energy through molecules such as ATP. Shimada's study explains how RbsR binds upstream of multiple genes that participate in de novo purine biosynthesis and purine salvage pathways. These are two major routes that cells rely on to maintain proper levels of purine molecules. This expands the protein's regulatory reach and means it can coordinate between both carbon and nucleotide metabolism.

In Bacillus subtilis, RbsR participates in a different regulatory context. Research found that it can actually interact with HPr, which is a key component of carbon catabolite repression. This interaction suggests that RbsR would ensure the genes for ribose metabolism are active only if ribose is available and when preferred food sources are not. The carbon catabolite repression process is important for the bacteria's growth since it ensures that if a highly favorable carbon source, such as glucose, is present, then it will be consumed first. This behavior would be beneficial to the bacteria's survival since nutrient availability varies in natural environments.

== Mechanism ==
RbsR controls expression through a classic inducible-repressor mechanism. This system relies on the protein's ability to switch between DNA-bound and DNA-free states depending on the presence of ribose.

=== DNA binding in the absence of ribose ===
In the absence of D-ribose, the transcriptional repressor RbsR is able to bind to the operator DNA sequence that is upstream of the promoter as a dimer. Each monomer inserts its recognition helix into one half of a palindromic operator sequence. This allows both helices to contact equivalent base pairs and enhance the binding strength. The helix-turn-helix structure found in the N-terminal acts as the recognition helix that binds to the major groove on the DNA. In doing so, it will inhibit the transcription of the rbs operon.

This binding relies on interactions between amino acid side chains in the recognition helix and bases in the major groove of the DNA. These interactions include hydrogen bonds, van der Waals contacts, and electrostatic interactions that position the protein precisely and prevent transcription.

=== Conformational changes triggered by ribose ===
When ribose binds to the C-terminal domain, the protein undergoes a conformational shift that spreads through its structural core. These changes affect the relative angles and distances between the DNA-binding helices. Even small changes in the spacing or orientation of the helices are enough to disrupt the match between the recognition helix and the DNA major groove.

=== Dissociation from DNA ===
After the structural changes in the protein are completed, it will lose compatibility with the DNA and dissociate from the operator. This enables RNA polymerase to bind to the promoter and begin transcription.

== Regulation ==
RbsR's regulatory behavior is controlled by an allosteric process, which means that ligand binding at one site on a protein affects activity at a different site. For RbsR, ribose binding to the C-terminal domain alters the structure of the N-terminal DNA-binding region.

When D-ribose is present in the cell, it acts as an allosteric effector for the RbsR protein. The RbsR repressor binds to the D-ribose ligand on the C-terminal side, utilizing the genes that are homologous to ribose-binding proteins (RBPs). After binding, there is a chemical signal sent to the RbsR that causes it to change in structure in the N-terminal helix-turn-helix DNA-binding domain. When this structure changes, the RbsR dissociates from the DNA since it is no longer able to align with the operator. This detachment from the operator allows transcription of the rbs operon to proceed.

== Evolutionary Perspective ==
The RbsR repressor's relationship to the LacI/GalR family has been studied extensively. This group has an evolutionary history that sheds a light on how bacteria acquired efficient and adaptable control of sugar metabolism. Phylogenetic and structural evidence suggest that the core design of LacI/GalR repressors came from an ancestral periplasmic binding protein, which over time obtained a DNA-binding domain. This change shifted its purpose from a simple sugar-binding protein to a transcriptional regulator.

As seen in RbsR, the C-terminal ligand-binding domain retains a strong resemblance to ancestral PBPs that originally functioned in sugar transport or sensing. Eventually, a primordial PBP acquired a small N-terminal helix-turn-helix DNA-binding domain. Phylogenetic studies suggest that the fusion had only happened once before the eubacterial lineages branched out.

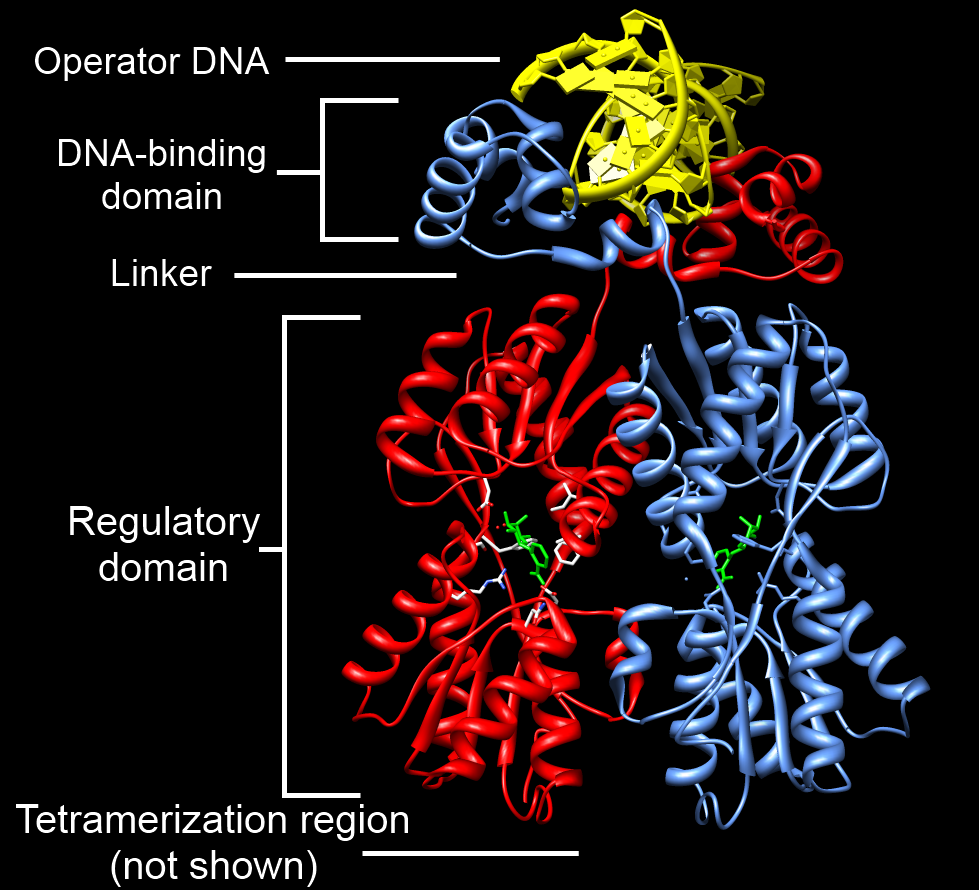
LacI dimer structure that contains two main regions similar to RbsR: headpiece for DNA-binding and regulatory region that recognizes the sugar.

Once the design was established, those two domains diversified widely. There have been over a thousand repressors of this family identified. Gene duplication, divergence and loss events across bacteria produced a large repertoire of regulators, each tailored to different sugars or small metabolites. For example, while RbsR regulates ribose metabolism, other members such as LacI regulates lactose or GalR regulates galactose, among many others.

Furthermore, ligand specificity in proteins such as RbsR appears to have evolved independently multiple times. This would mean that the ability to bind ribose did not originate from a single ancestral ribose-binding protein. Structural comparisons between LacI/GalR repressors and PBPs show that even though they both recognize ribose, there is a difference in their sequence that would indicate that ribose binding emerged through convergent or parallel evolution.

== Significance ==
RbsR has significance that goes beyond its role as a regulator of ribose metabolism. By repressing the rbs operon in the absence of ribose, RbsR is able to maintain metabolic efficiency and help the bacteria avoid using resources on unnecessary transporters and enzymes. This repression-activation switch helps bacteria optimize growth under fluctuating environmental conditions.

Additionally, RbsR can coordinate carbon and nucleotide metabolism through its involvement in purine regulation. RbsR integrates carbohydrate availability with nucleotide synthesis, which helps supply ribose-5-phosphate, ATP, and GTP with cellular growth demands, thus ensuring metabolic homeostasis. In this way, RbsR acts as an integrator of central metabolic pathways, supporting cellular homeostasis.

The ribose-binding domain can also be computationally redesigned to recognize new ligands, making it useful for synthetic biology. Its inclusion of the ribose-binding protein sequence in its structure also provides insights into how bacteria have evolved. In Bacillus subtilis, the interaction with HPr suggests that RbsR is woven into broader carbon catabolite regulation pathways. This makes RbsR a key part of metabolic prioritization strategies used by bacteria.
