= D-ribulokinase =

Identifiers
- EC no.: 2.7.1.47
- CAS no.: 9026-40-8

Databases
- IntEnz: IntEnz view
- BRENDA: BRENDA entry
- ExPASy: NiceZyme view
- KEGG: KEGG entry
- MetaCyc: metabolic pathway
- PRIAM: profile
- PDB structures: RCSB PDB PDBe PDBsum
- Gene Ontology: AmiGO / QuickGO
Search
- PMC: articles
- PubMed: articles
- NCBI: proteins

D-ribulokinase (EC 2.7.1.47) is an enzyme that catalyzes the chemical reaction

ATP +
D-ribulose
ADP +
D-ribulose-5-phosphate

The enzyme characterised from Aerobacter aerogenes converts the pentose sugar, D-ribulose, (shown in its open-chain keto form) to D-ribulose-5-phosphate by transferring a phosphate group from the cofactor, adenosine triphosphate (ATP), which is converted to adenosine diphosphate (ADP). D-ribulose-5-phosphate is one of the end-products of the pentose phosphate pathway. The enzyme is also found in yeast and mammals.

It is a transferases, specifically one transferring phosphorus-containing groups (phosphotransferases) with an alcohol group as acceptor. The systematic name of this enzyme class is ATP:D-ribulose 5-phosphotransferase. It is also called D-ribulokinase (phosphorylating).
