= Ribulokinase =

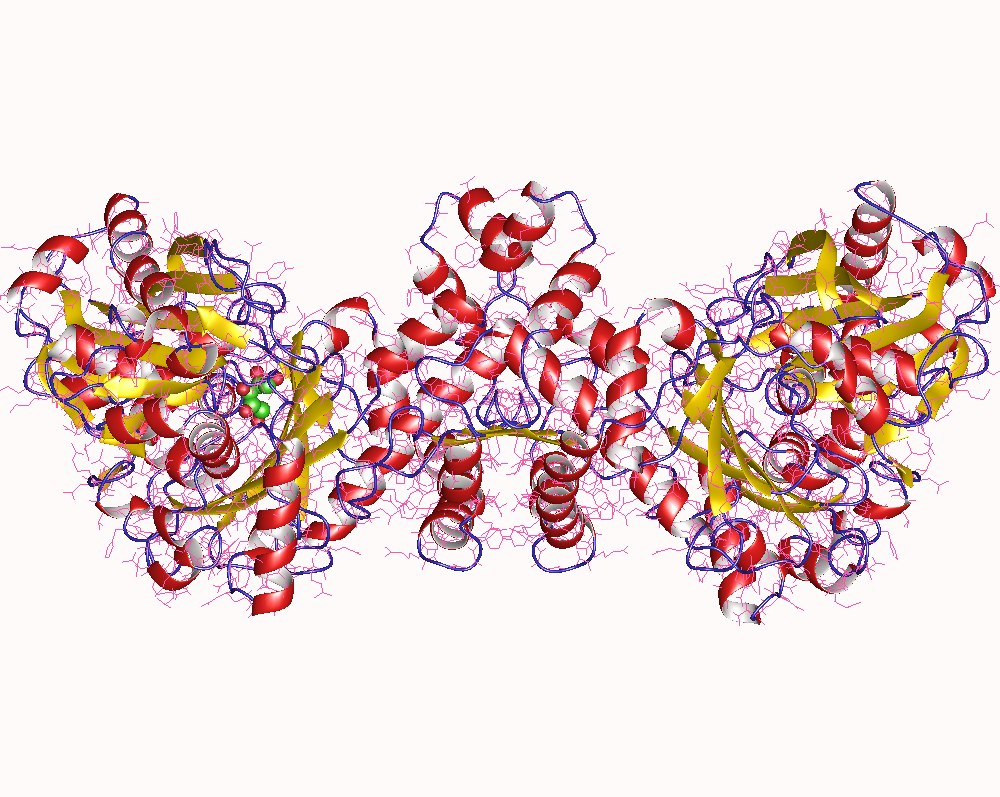
- Ribulokinase dimer, Bacillus halodurans

Identifiers
- EC no.: 2.7.1.16
- CAS no.: 9030-57-3

Databases
- IntEnz: IntEnz view
- BRENDA: BRENDA entry
- ExPASy: NiceZyme view
- KEGG: KEGG entry
- MetaCyc: metabolic pathway
- PRIAM: profile
- PDB structures: RCSB PDB PDBe PDBsum
- Gene Ontology: AmiGO / QuickGO
Search
- PMC: articles
- PubMed: articles
- NCBI: proteins

Ribulokinase (EC 2.7.1.16) is an enzyme that catalyzes two chemical reactions

ATP +
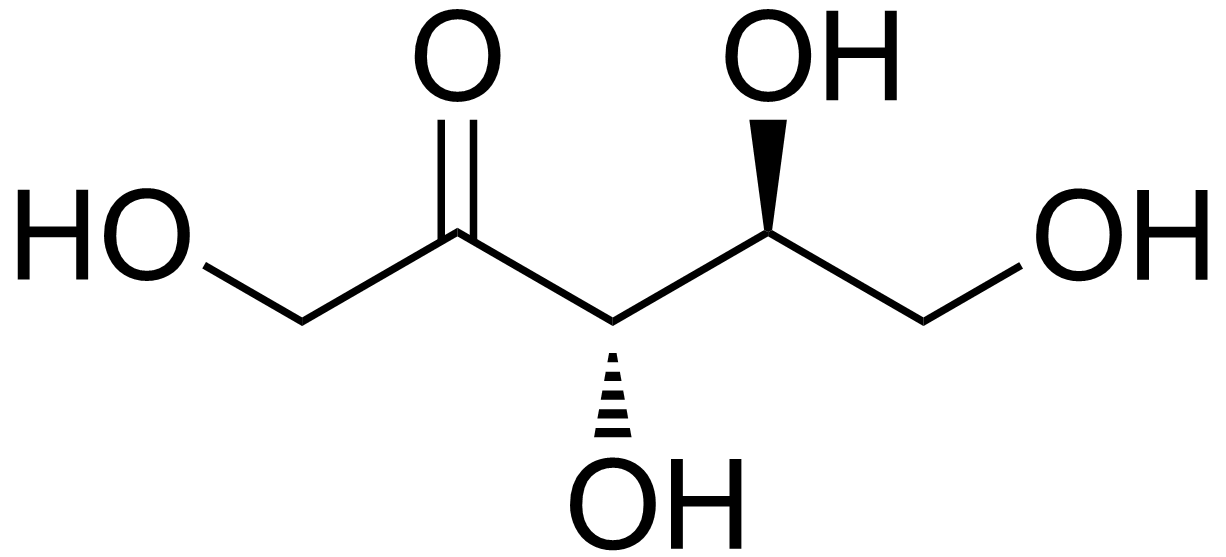
L-ribulose
ADP +
L-ribulose 5-phosphate

The enzyme characterised from Aerobacter aerogenes and Escherichia coli converts the pentose sugar, L-ribulose, to L-ribulose 5-phosphate by transferring a phosphate group from the cofactor, adenosine triphosphate (ATP), which is converted to adenosine diphosphate (ADP). This reaction is part of a pathway that allows these bacteria to metabolise L-arabinose.

The enzyme from Lactobacillus plantarum can also act on D-rubulose:

ATP +
D-ribulose
ADP +
D-ribulose 5-phosphate

This enzyme is a transferase, specifically one transferring phosphorus-containing groups (phosphotransferases) with an alcohol group as acceptor. The systematic name of this enzyme class is ATP:L(or D)-ribulose 5-phosphotransferase. Other names in common use include ribulokinase (phosphorylating), and L-ribulokinase.
