= Maltose-binding protein =

Type of protein

Maltose/maltodextrin-binding periplasmic protein
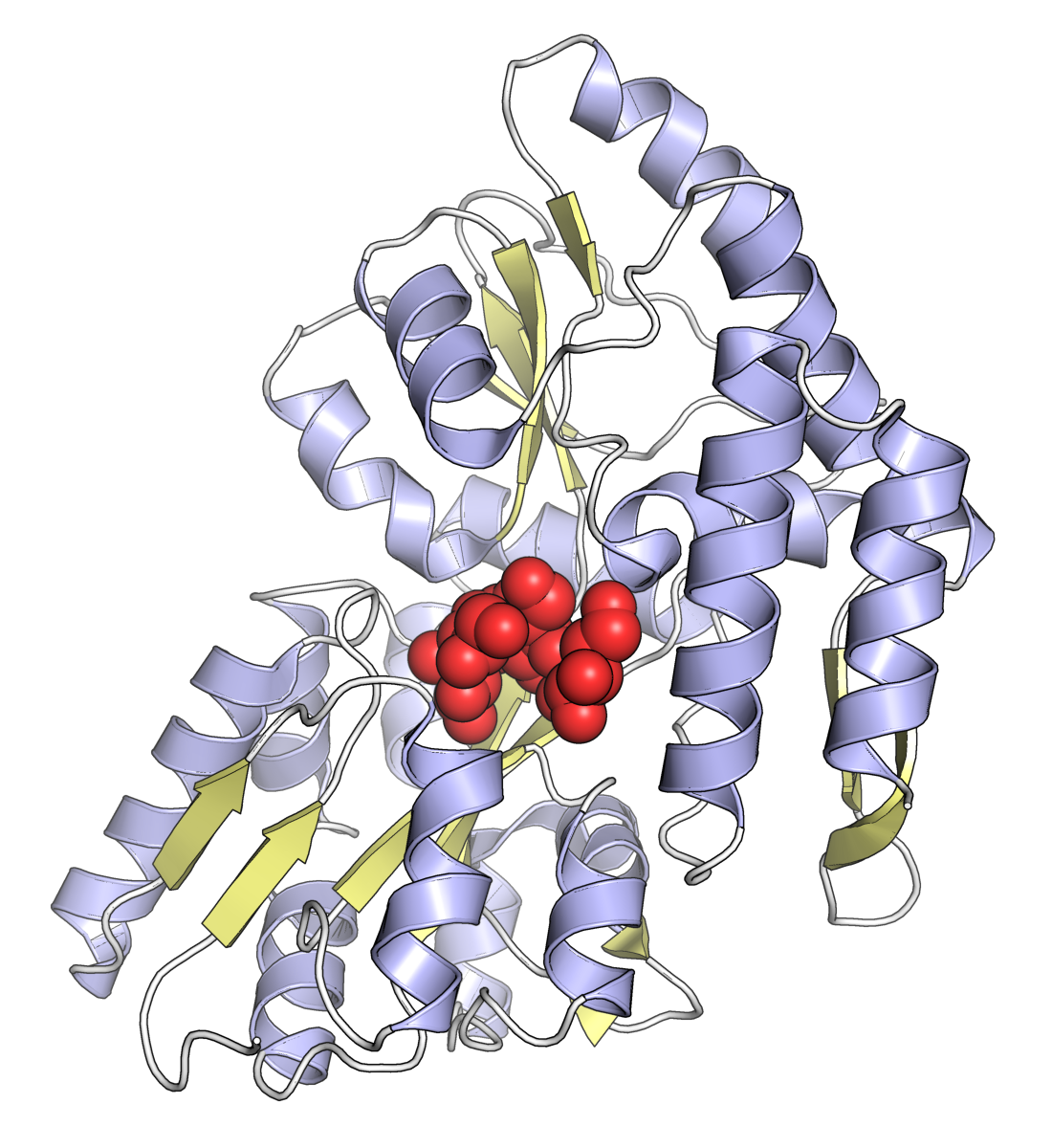
- Maltose-binding protein from Escherichia coli, with a bound sugar molecule shown as red spheres, from PDB: 1FQC.

Identifiers
- Organism: Escherichia coli
- Symbol: MalE
- Orthologs: OMA: entry
- UniProt: P0AEX9
Search for
- Structures: Swiss-model
- Domains: InterPro

Maltose-binding protein (MBP) is a part of the maltose/maltodextrin system of Escherichia coli, which is responsible for the uptake and efficient catabolism of maltodextrins. It is a complex regulatory and transport system involving many proteins and protein complexes. MBP has an approximate molecular mass of 42.5 kilodaltons.

== Structure and folding ==
MBP is encoded by the malE gene of Escherichia coli. The malE gene codes for a precursor polypeptide (396 amino acid residues) which yields the mature MBP (370 residues) upon cleavage of the NH_{2}-terminal extension (26 residues). The precursor and mature forms of MBP do not contain any cysteine residues.

MBP is a monomeric protein. Crystal structures have shown that MBP is divided into two distinct globular domains that are connected by three short polypeptide segments. The two domains are separated by a deep groove that contains the maltose/maltodextrin binding site. Comparison of the structures of the liganded and unliganded forms of MBP has shown that the binding of maltose induces a major conformational change that closes the groove by a rigid motion of the two domains around the linking polypeptide hinge.

Both precursor and mature forms of MBP are functional for the binding of maltose. The NH_{2}-terminal extension decreases the folding rate of the precursor form of MBP relative to its mature form by at least 5 fold, but it has no effect on the unfolding rate. The equilibrium unfolding of MBP can be modelled by a two-state mechanism with a stability ∆G(H_{2}O) equal to 9.45 kcal mol^{−1} at 25 °C, pH 7.6.

== Localization and export ==
MBP is exported into the periplasmic space of E. coli. The NH_{2}-terminal extension of MBP, also termed signal peptide, has two roles: (i) it slows down folding of the newly synthesized polypeptide, and (ii) it directs this polypeptide to the membrane and SecYEG translocon. Once folded, the precursor can no longer enter the translocation pathway. The introduction of a charged amino-acid residue or a proline residue within the hydrophobic core of the signal peptide is sufficient to block export. The defective exports of the mutant MBPs are consistent with the alpha-helical conformation and hydrophobic interactions of the signal peptide in its interaction with the translocon motor protein SecA.

== Control of expression ==
The malE gene, coding for MBP, belongs to the Mal regulon of E. coli, which consists of ten genes whose products are geared for the efficient uptake and utilization of maltose and maltodextrins. All the gene involved in the transport of maltose/maltodextrin, including malE, are clustered in the malB region of E. coli and organized in two divergent operons: malE-malF-malG and malK-lamB. The transcription start sites at the malEp and malKp promoters are distant of 271 base pairs.

The malEp and malKp promoters are synergistically activated by protein MalT, the activator of the Mal regulon and by the cAMP receptor protein CRP. This activation is a coupled process that involves, going from malEp towards malKp: two MalT binding sites; three CRP binding sites, and two overlapping sets of three MalT binding sites, staggered by three base pairs. Transcription activation requires the binding of adenosine triphosphate (ATP) and maltotriose to MalT and the binding of cyclic AMP to the dimer of CRP. The unliganded form of MalT is monomeric whereas its liganded form, in the presence of ATP and maltotriose, is oligomeric.

== Use as a protein and peptide vector ==
MBP is used to increase the solubility of recombinant proteins expressed in E. coli. In these systems, the protein of interest is often expressed as a MBP-fusion protein, preventing aggregation of the protein of interest. The mechanism by which MBP increases solubility is not well understood. In addition, MBP can itself be used as an affinity tag for purification of recombinant proteins. The fusion protein binds to amylose columns while all other proteins flow through. The MBP-protein fusion can be purified by eluting the column with maltose. Once the fusion protein is obtained in purified form, the protein of interest is often cleaved from MBP with a specific protease and can then be separated from MBP by affinity chromatography.

A first study of the relations between structure and functions of MBP was performed by random insertion of a short DNA fragment, coding for a BamHI restriction site, into the malE gene. Some of the insertions affected the functions of MBP whereas others were permissive. The permissive sites that were internal to MBP, were used to insert antigenic peptides and challenge the immune response in mice. The 3'-OH terminal insertions were used to create fusion proteins and develop the use of MBP as an affinity handle for the purification of foreign proteins and peptides by affinity chromatography on cross-linked amylose and elution with maltose in mild physico-chemical conditions. Several plasmid vectors were developed to facilitate the expression and purification of such fusion proteins.

When the recombinant MBP includes a signal peptide, the fusion protein can be exported into the periplasmic space, which facilitates its purification since the periplasmic fluid contains only a limited number of proteins and can be recovered either by an osmotic shock or by permeabilization of the bacterial outer membrane with antibiotics such as Polymyxin B. Such an export of the fusion protein into the periplasmic space enables the formation of disulfide bonds in the passenger protein, for example antibody fragments. Foreign proteins that are exported or secreted in their native organism, can usually be exported into the E. coli periplasm by fusion with MBP. Examples of cytoplasmic proteins that could be exported by fusion with MBP, include the monomeric Klenow polymerase and the dimeric Gene V protein of phage M13. When the recombinant MBP includes either a defective or no signal peptide the fusion protein remains within the bacterial cytoplasm from where it can be recovered by breaking open the cells.

The fusion of proteins with MBP usually enhances their solubility and facilitates their proper folding so that the fusion proteins are most often bifunctional. In addition, such fusions can facilitate the crystallisation of difficult proteins, e.g. membrane proteins. The crystallized protein can often have their structures solved by X-ray crystallography using molecular replacement on a known MBP structure.

== See also ==
- Protein tag
- Fluorescent glucose biosensors
- Glutathione S-transferase
