= Ribitol 2-dehydrogenase =

Class of enzymes

ribitol 2-dehydrogenase

Identifiers
- EC no.: 1.1.1.56
- CAS no.: 9014-23-7

Databases
- IntEnz: IntEnz view
- BRENDA: BRENDA entry
- ExPASy: NiceZyme view
- KEGG: KEGG entry
- MetaCyc: metabolic pathway
- PRIAM: profile
- PDB structures: RCSB PDB PDBe PDBsum
- Gene Ontology: AmiGO / QuickGO
Search
- PMC: articles
- PubMed: articles
- NCBI: proteins

In enzymology, a ribitol 2-dehydrogenase (EC 1.1.1.56) is an enzyme that catalyzes the chemical reaction

Ribitol
+ NAD^{+}
H^{+}
H^{+}
D-Ribulose
+ NADH

The two substrates of this enzyme are ribitol and oxidised nicotinamide adenine dinucleotide (NAD^{+}). Its products are D-ribulose, reduced NADH, and a proton.

This enzyme participates in pentose and glucuronate interconversions.

== Nomenclature ==
This enzyme belongs to the family of oxidoreductases, specifically those acting on the CH-OH group of donor with NAD^{+} or NADP^{+} as acceptor. The systematic name of this enzyme class is ribitol:NAD^{+} 2-oxidoreductase. Other names in common use include adonitol dehydrogenase, ribitol dehydrogenase A (wild type), ribitol dehydrogenase B (mutant enzyme with different properties), and ribitol dehydrogenase D (mutant enzyme with different properties).
