= L-arabinokinase =

Identifiers
- EC no.: 2.7.1.46
- CAS no.: 37277-99-9

Databases
- IntEnz: IntEnz view
- BRENDA: BRENDA entry
- ExPASy: NiceZyme view
- KEGG: KEGG entry
- MetaCyc: metabolic pathway
- PRIAM: profile
- PDB structures: RCSB PDB PDBe PDBsum
- Gene Ontology: AmiGO / QuickGO
Search
- PMC: articles
- PubMed: articles
- NCBI: proteins

L-arabinokinase (EC 2.7.1.46) is an enzyme that catalyzes the chemical reaction

ATP +
L-arabinose
ADP +
β-L-arabinose 1-phosphate

The enzyme characterised from mung bean converts L-arabinose (shown in its open-chain aldehydo form) to β-L-arabinose 1-phosphate by transferring a phosphate group from the cofactor, adenosine triphosphate (ATP), which is converted to adenosine diphosphate (ADP).

This enzyme is a transferase, specifically one transferring phosphorus-containing groups (phosphotransferases) with an alcohol group as acceptor. The systematic name of this enzyme class is ATP:L-arabinose 1-phosphotransferase. This enzyme is also called L-arabinokinase (phosphorylating).
