= D-arabinose 1-dehydrogenase (NAD(P)+) =

D-arabinose 1-dehydrogenase [NAD(P)^{+}]

Identifiers
- EC no.: 1.1.1.117
- CAS no.: 37250-48-9

Databases
- IntEnz: IntEnz view
- BRENDA: BRENDA entry
- ExPASy: NiceZyme view
- KEGG: KEGG entry
- MetaCyc: metabolic pathway
- PRIAM: profile
- PDB structures: RCSB PDB PDBe PDBsum
- Gene Ontology: AmiGO / QuickGO
Search
- PMC: articles
- PubMed: articles
- NCBI: proteins

In enzymology, a D-arabinose 1-dehydrogenase [NAD(P)^{+}] (EC 1.1.1.117) is an enzyme that catalyzes the chemical reaction

D-arabinose + NAD(P)^{+} $\rightleftharpoons$ D-arabinono-1,4-lactone + NAD(P)H + H^{+}

The 3 substrates of this enzyme are D-arabinose, NAD^{+}, and NADP^{+}, whereas its 4 products are D-arabinono-1,4-lactone, NADH, NADPH, and H^{+}.

This enzyme belongs to the family of oxidoreductases, specifically those acting on the CH-OH group of donor with NAD^{+} or NADP^{+} as acceptor. The systematic name of this enzyme class is D-arabinose:NAD(P)^{+} 1-oxidoreductase. This enzyme is also called D-arabinose 1-dehydrogenase [NAD(P)^{+}].

== Structural studies ==
As of late 2007, only one structure has been solved for this class of enzymes, with the PDB accession code 2H6E.
