= Mal regulon =

Regulon associated with the catabolism of maltose and maltodextrins

In bacterial genetics, the mal regulon is a regulon - or group of genes under common regulation - associated with the catabolism of maltose and maltodextrins. The system is especially well characterized in the model organism Escherichia coli, where it is classically described as a group of ten genes in multiple operons whose expression is regulated by a single regulatory protein (specifically an activator), malT.

In many Gram-positive bacteria, such as Streptococcus pneumoniae, maltose catabolism is regulated differently, via a transcriptional repressor called malR, in the lac repressor family.

== MalT ==
=== Escherichia coli ===
In Escherichia coli (Enterobacteriaceae, Pseudomonadota), MalT binds to maltose or maltodextrin and undergoes a conformational change that allows it to bind DNA at sequences near the promoters of genes required for uptake and catabolism of these sugars. The maltose regulation system in E. coli is a classic example of positive regulation.

malT is regulated by catabolite repression via the catabolite activator protein. Genes under the control of malT include three operons (malEFG, malK-lamB-malM and malPQ) and two loose genes (malS, malZ). These encode ATP-binding cassette transporter components (MalEFGK_{2}), maltoporin (LamB), maltose binding protein (MalE), and several enzymes (maltodextrin phosphorylase MalP, maltodextrin glucosidase MalZ, periplasmic alpha-amylase MalS, amylomaltase MalQ). The function of malM is unclear.

malT can be activated by endogenous maltotriose, so it could be activated by alternative sources of this substance such as glycogen degradation and direct synthesis.

malK can act as a repressor. It possibly does this by binding to MalT. MalY (from the malXY operon) also seems to be a repressor and so is Aes, possibly also by binding to MalT. Phosphorylated PhoP has an effect on the expression of MalT-controlled genes, but not MalT itself.

=== Other bacteria ===
Other Gram-negative bacteria may have additional genes under the control of malT. For example, Klebsiella pneumoniae (Enterobacteriaceae) has a set of pul genes for the biosynthesis and the secretion of pullulanase under the control of malT. Klebsiella oxytoca has a set of cym genes for the uptake and use of cyclodextrins.

It is also known the maltose regulon is implicated in the pathogenicity of Vibrio cholerae (Vibrionaceae, Pseudomonadota) and that mutation in the Vch malQ and malF reduces its virulence. Salmonella sv. Typhimurium (Enterobacteriaceae) also has a version of malM.

== MalR ==
=== Streptococcus ===
In Streptococcus pneumoniae (Streptococcaceae, Bacillota), maltose catabolism is regulated via a transcriptional repressor called malR, in the lac repressor family. malR binds a part upstream to dexB (glucan 1,6-alpha-glucosidase), ptsG (PTS system, IIABC components), malMP (M: maltodextrin, P: glycogen phosphorylase family protein) and malXCD (X: maltose/maltodextrin ABC transporter, CD: maltodextrin permease). malR is encoded on the malAR operon. Additional parts under the control of malR (and thus a part of the mal regulon) include an amylase AmyA2, a glucokinase RokB, and (like in Klebsiella) a pullulanase PulA.

In Streptococcus mutans, the mal regulon includes at least the operons malQ-glgP, malXFGK/malEFGK, repressed by malR. (The S. mutans operons are mainly named by homology to E. coli: identical names indicate closest match and possible functional correspondence. S. mutans has two subfunctionalized copies of the system called mal and msm. S. pneumoniae malXCD corresponds to S. mutans mal(X/E)FG/msmEFG.) There is also a MalT under the control of MalR, but it is actually yet another ABC transporter, a part of the phosphoenolpyruvate-dependent phosphotransferase system (PTS).

In S. pyogenes, there are two ABC transporter operons in a "head-to-head" orientation, malXCD and malEFG.

=== Other bacteria ===
In Streptomyces coelicolor (Streptomycetaceae, Actinomycetota), the transcription of the malEFG transporter gene cluster is induced by maltose and repressed by malR.

In Lactococcus lactis (Streptococcaceae), MalR instead acts as a transcriptional activator of the mal regulon; in this context the "R" is reinterpreted as "regulator" (still homologous to the Streptococcus MalR and part of the lac repressor family).

== Other regulators ==
Sulfolobus acidocaldarius, which is not a bacterium (an archaeon), uses a MalR of the TrmB family as an activator of the maltose regulon, including the ABC transporter ABC transporter (malEFGK), α-amylase (amyA), and α-glycosidase (malA). Although also called "MalR", it is not in the same family as the lac repressor. Still, this is in contrast to the function of most TrmB members, which is to act as a repressor.
