= CSID =

CSID may refer to:

- Called Subscriber Identification, for fax machines
- Congenital Sucrase-Isomaltase Deficiency
- Civil Status Identity Document (CSID), provided to Iraqi citizens
- Carbon starvation induced gene (csiD), see gab operon
