= L-arabinose isomerase =

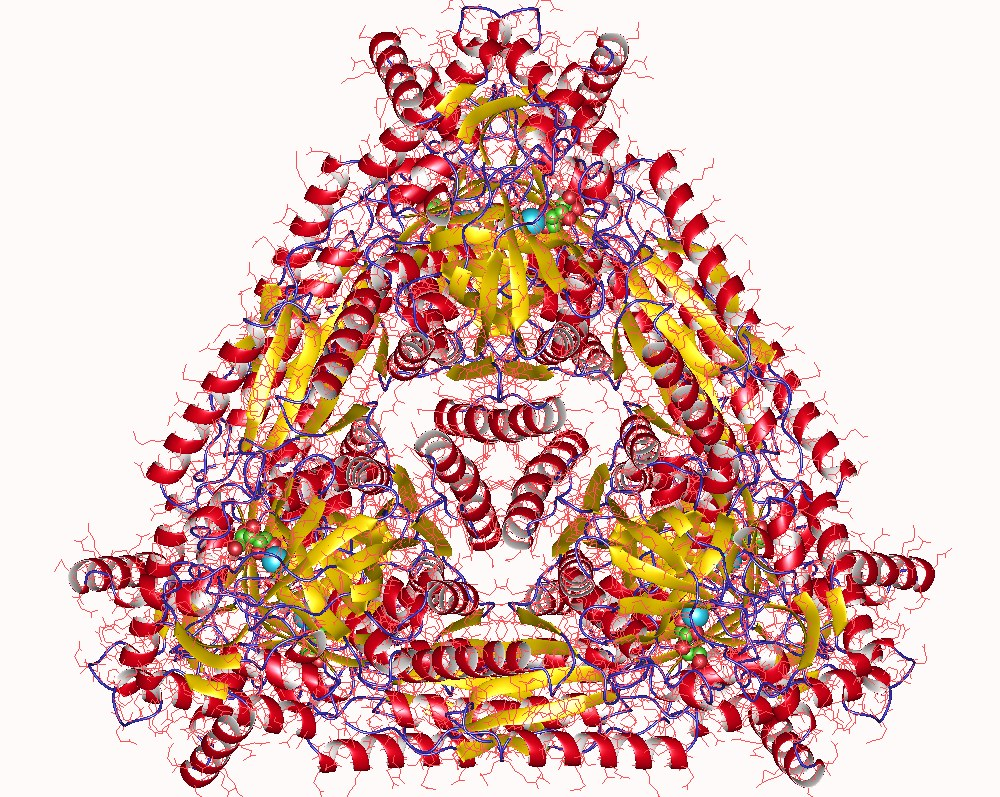
- L-arabinose isomerase hexamer, Geobacillus kaustophilus

Identifiers
- EC no.: 5.3.1.4
- CAS no.: 9023-80-7

Databases
- BRENDA: enzyme data
- ExPASy: NiceZyme view
- KEGG: enzyme entry
- MetaCyc: metabolic pathway
- Rhea: reactions
- PDB structures: RCSB PDB PDBe PDBsum
- Gene Ontology: AmiGO / QuickGO
Search
- PMC: articles
- PubMed: articles
- NCBI: proteins

Arabinose isomerase
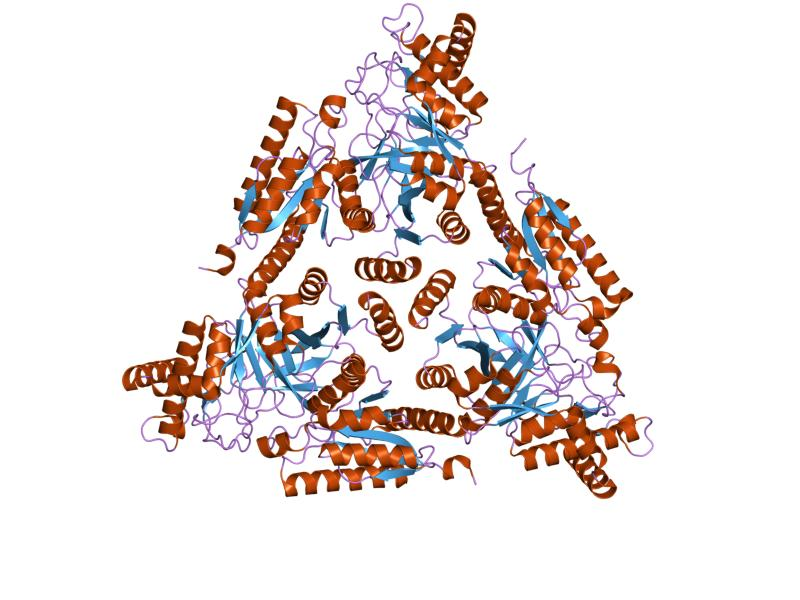
- crystal structure of l-arabinose isomerase from e.coli

Identifiers
- Symbol: Arabinose_Isome
- Pfam: PF02610
- InterPro: IPR003762
Available protein structures:
- PDB: IPR003762 PF02610 (ECOD; PDBsum)
- AlphaFold: IPR003762; PF02610

In enzymology, a L-arabinose isomerase (EC 5.3.1.4) is an enzyme that catalyzes the chemical reaction

L-arabinose $\rightleftharpoons$ L-ribulose

Hence, this enzyme has one substrate, L-arabinose, and one product, L-ribulose.

This enzyme belongs to the family of isomerases, specifically those intramolecular oxidoreductases interconverting aldoses and ketoses. The systematic name of this enzyme class is L-arabinose aldose-ketose-isomerase. This enzyme participates in pentose and glucuronate interconversions.

This enzyme catalyses the conversion of L-arabinose to L-ribulose as the first step in the pathway of L-arabinose utilization as a carbon source.

== Industrial applications ==
In 1993, scientists discovered that L-arabinose isomerase from the bacterium Lactobacillus gayonii can convert D-Galactose to D-Tagatose. Tagatose is a biologically rare sugar that has been explored as an alternative sweetening agent in foods due to its low glycemic index. L-arabinose isomerase has been explored as a biological method for producing this sugar industrially.

== Structural studies ==
As of late 2007, two structures have been solved for this class of enzymes, with PDB accession codes PDB: 2AJT and PDB: 2HXG.
