= L-arabinose 1-dehydrogenase =

Class of enzymes

Identifiers
- EC no.: 1.1.1.46
- CAS no.: 9028-52-8

Databases
- IntEnz: IntEnz view
- BRENDA: BRENDA entry
- ExPASy: NiceZyme view
- KEGG: KEGG entry
- MetaCyc: metabolic pathway
- PRIAM: profile
- PDB structures: RCSB PDB PDBe PDBsum
- Gene Ontology: AmiGO / QuickGO
Search
- PMC: articles
- PubMed: articles
- NCBI: proteins

In enzymology, a L-arabinose 1-dehydrogenase (EC 1.1.1.46) is an enzyme that catalyzes the chemical reaction

L-arabinose
+ NAD^{+}
H^{+}
H^{+}
L-arabino-1,4-lactone
+ NADH

The two substrates of this enzyme are L-arabinose and oxidised nicotinamide adenine dinucleotide (NAD^{+}). Its products are L-arabino-1,4-lactone, reduced NADH, and a proton.

This enzyme belongs to the family of oxidoreductases, specifically those acting on the CH-OH group of donor with NAD^{+} or NADP^{+} as acceptor. The systematic name of this enzyme class is L-arabinose:NAD^{+} 1-oxidoreductase. This enzyme participates in ascorbate and aldarate metabolism.
