= D-arabinitol 2-dehydrogenase =

Identifiers
- EC no.: 1.1.1.250
- CAS no.: 336883-93-3

Databases
- IntEnz: IntEnz view
- BRENDA: BRENDA entry
- ExPASy: NiceZyme view
- KEGG: KEGG entry
- MetaCyc: metabolic pathway
- PRIAM: profile
- PDB structures: RCSB PDB PDBe PDBsum
- Gene Ontology: AmiGO / QuickGO
Search
- PMC: articles
- PubMed: articles
- NCBI: proteins

In enzymology, a D-arabinitol 2-dehydrogenase (EC 1.1.1.250) is an enzyme that catalyzes the chemical reaction

D-arabinitol + NAD^{+} ⇌ D-ribulose + NADH + H^{+}

Thus, the two substrates of this enzyme are D-arabinitol and NAD^{+}, whereas its 3 products are D-ribulose, NADH, and H^{+}.

This enzyme belongs to the family of oxidoreductases, specifically those acting on the CH-OH group of donor with NAD^{+} or NADP^{+} as acceptor. The systematic name of this enzyme class is D-arabinitol:NAD^{+} 2-oxidoreductase (D-ribulose-forming). This enzyme is also called D-arabinitol 2-dehydrogenase (ribulose-forming).
