= D-arabinose 1-dehydrogenase =

Class of enzymes

Identifiers
- EC no.: 1.1.1.116
- CAS no.: 37250-47-8

Databases
- IntEnz: IntEnz view
- BRENDA: BRENDA entry
- ExPASy: NiceZyme view
- KEGG: KEGG entry
- MetaCyc: metabolic pathway
- PRIAM: profile
- PDB structures: RCSB PDB PDBe PDBsum
- Gene Ontology: AmiGO / QuickGO
Search
- PMC: articles
- PubMed: articles
- NCBI: proteins

In enzymology, D-arabinose 1-dehydrogenase (EC 1.1.1.116) is an enzyme that catalyzes the chemical reaction

D-arabinose
+ NAD^{+}
H^{+}
H^{+}
D-arabino-1,4-lactone
+ NADH

The two substrates of this enzyme are D-arabinose and oxidised nicotinamide adenine dinucleotide (NAD^{+}). Its products are D-arabino-1,4-lactone, reduced NADH, and a proton.

This enzyme belongs to the family of oxidoreductases, specifically those acting on the CH-OH group of donor with NAD^{+} or NADP^{+} as acceptor. The systematic name of this enzyme class is D-arabinose:NAD^{+} 1-oxidoreductase. Other names in common use include NAD^{+}-pentose-dehydrogenase, and arabinose(fucose)dehydrogenase.
