= L-fucose isomerase =

Identifiers
- EC no.: 5.3.1.25
- CAS no.: 60063-83-4

Databases
- BRENDA: enzyme data
- ExPASy: NiceZyme view
- KEGG: enzyme entry
- MetaCyc: metabolic pathway
- Rhea: reactions
- PDB structures: RCSB PDB PDBe PDBsum
- Gene Ontology: AmiGO / QuickGO
Search
- PMC: articles
- PubMed: articles
- NCBI: proteins

L-fucose isomerase, first N-terminal domain
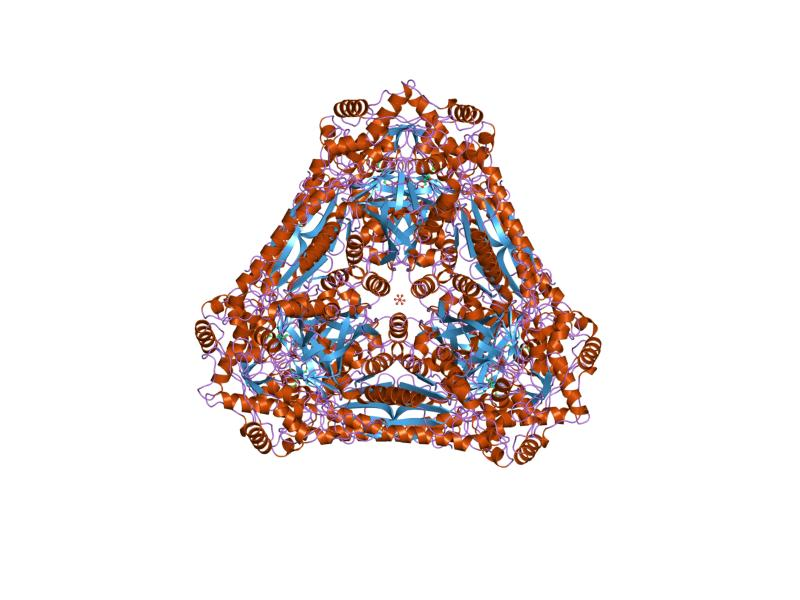
- l-fucose isomerase from escherichia coli

Identifiers
- Symbol: Fucose_iso_N1
- Pfam: PF07881
- InterPro: IPR012888
- SCOP2: 1fui / SCOPe / SUPFAM
Available protein structures:
- PDB: IPR012888 PF07881 (ECOD; PDBsum)
- AlphaFold: IPR012888; PF07881

L-fucose isomerase, second N-terminal domain
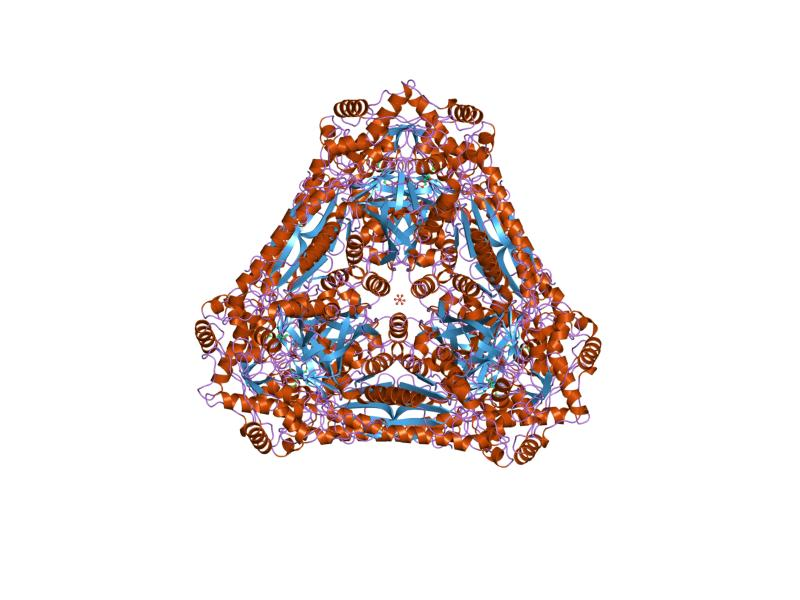
- l-fucose isomerase from escherichia coli

Identifiers
- Symbol: Fucose_iso_N2
- Pfam: PF07882
- InterPro: IPR012889
- SCOP2: 1fui / SCOPe / SUPFAM
Available protein structures:
- PDB: IPR012889 PF07882 (ECOD; PDBsum)
- AlphaFold: IPR012889; PF07882

L-fucose isomerase, C-terminal domain
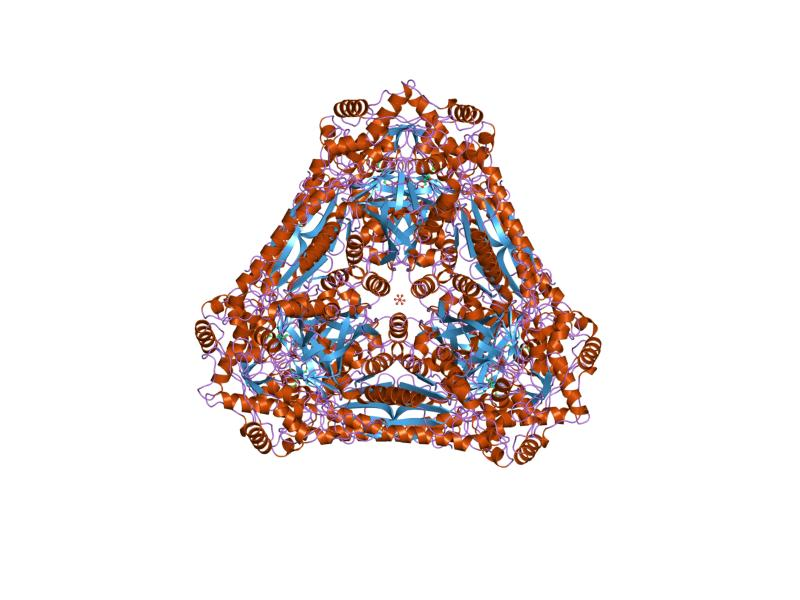
- l-fucose isomerase from escherichia coli

Identifiers
- Symbol: Fucose_iso_C
- Pfam: PF02952
- Pfam clan: CL0393
- InterPro: IPR015888
- SCOP2: 1fui / SCOPe / SUPFAM
Available protein structures:
- PDB: IPR015888 PF02952 (ECOD; PDBsum)
- AlphaFold: IPR015888; PF02952

In enzymology, a L-fucose isomerase (EC 5.3.1.25) is an enzyme that catalyzes the chemical reaction

L-fucose $\rightleftharpoons$ L-fuculose

Hence, this enzyme has one substrate, L-fucose, and one product, L-fuculose.

This enzyme belongs to the family of isomerases, specifically those intramolecular oxidoreductases interconverting aldoses and ketoses. The systematic name of this enzyme class is L-fucose aldose-ketose-isomerase. This enzyme participates in fructose and mannose metabolism.

The enzyme is a hexamer, forming the largest structurally known ketol isomerase, and has no sequence or structural similarity with other ketol isomerases. The structure was determined by X-ray crystallography at 2.5 Angstrom resolution. Each subunit of the hexameric enzyme is wedge-shaped and composed of three domains. Both domains 1 and 2 contain central parallel beta- sheets with surrounding alpha helices. The active centre is shared between pairs of subunits related along the molecular three-fold axis, with domains 2 and 3 from one subunit providing most of the substrate-contacting residues.
