= L-fuculose-phosphate aldolase =

Identifiers
- EC no.: 4.1.2.17
- CAS no.: 9024-54-8

Databases
- IntEnz: IntEnz view
- BRENDA: BRENDA entry
- ExPASy: NiceZyme view
- KEGG: KEGG entry
- MetaCyc: metabolic pathway
- PRIAM: profile
- PDB structures: RCSB PDB PDBe PDBsum
- Gene Ontology: AmiGO / QuickGO
Search
- PMC: articles
- PubMed: articles
- NCBI: proteins

The enzyme L-fuculose-phosphate aldolase (EC 4.1.2.17) catalyzes the chemical reaction

L-fuculose-1-phosphate $\rightleftharpoons$ glycerone phosphate + (S)-lactaldehyde

This enzyme belongs to the family of lyases, specifically the aldehyde-lyases, which cleave carbon-carbon bonds. The systematic name of this enzyme class is L-fuculose-1-phosphate (S)-lactaldehyde-lyase (glycerone-phosphate-forming). Other names in common use include L-fuculose 1-phosphate aldolase, fuculose aldolase, and L-fuculose-1-phosphate lactaldehyde-lyase. This enzyme participates in fructose and mannose metabolism.

== Structural studies ==
As of late 2007, 20 structures have been solved for this class of enzymes, with PDB accession codes 1DZU, 1DZV, 1DZW, 1DZX, 1DZY, 1DZZ, 1E46, 1E47, 1E48, 1E49, 1E4A, 1E4B, 1E4C, 1FUA, 2FK5, 2FLF, 2FUA, 2OPI, 3FUA, and 4FUA.

== See also ==
- Fuculose
- L-Fuculose kinase
