= Arabinosyl nucleoside =

β-D-Ribofuranose

β-D-Arabinofuranose

Arabinosyl nucleosides are derivatives of the nucleosides. They contain β-D-arabinofuranose, in contrast to most nucleosides which contain β-D-ribofuranose. They are used as cytostatics or virostatics.

== Examples ==
Cytarabine

Vidarabine

Nelarabine

Fludarabine

Clofarabine

Sorivudine

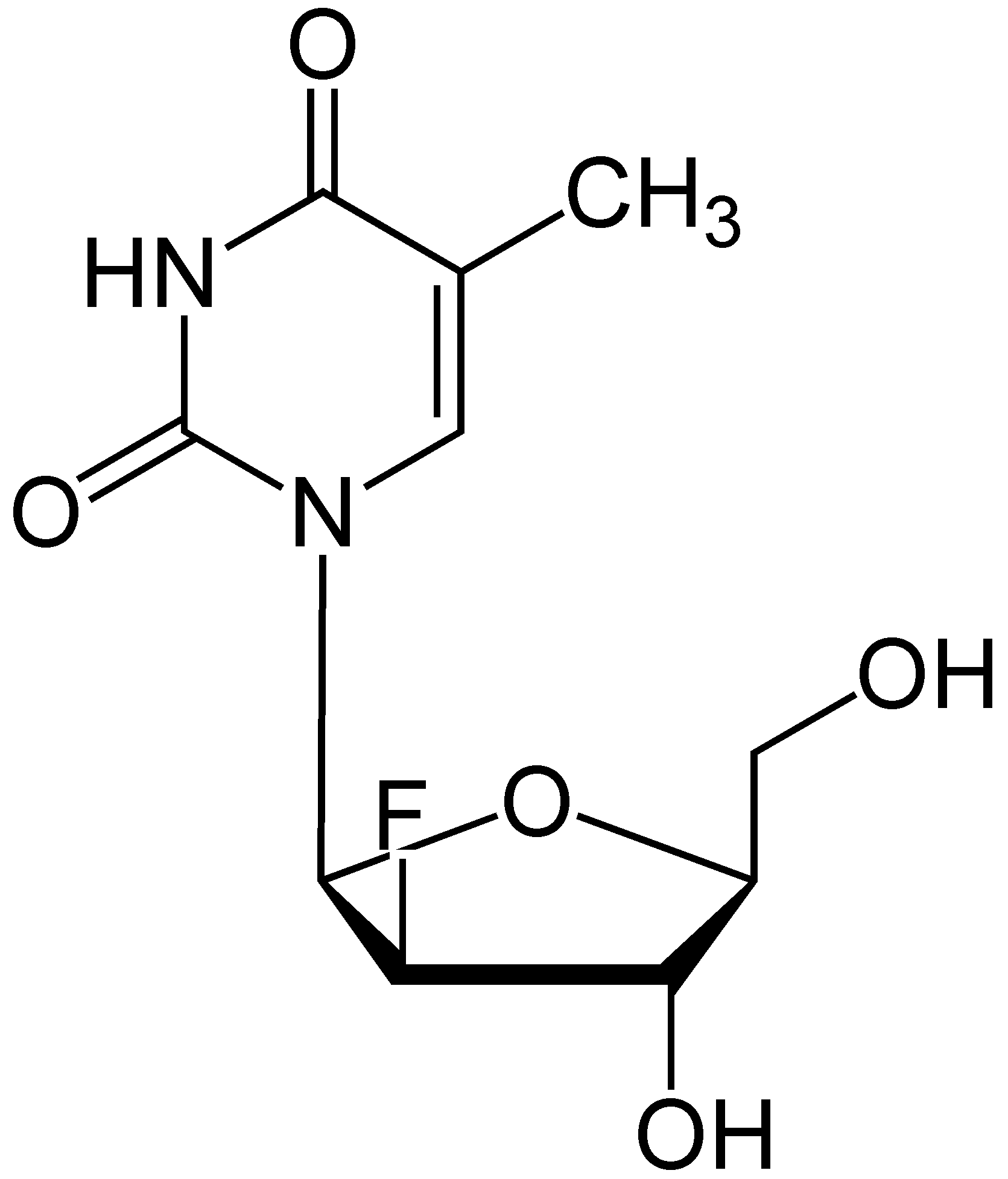
Clevudine
