= Fuculose =

l-Fuculose
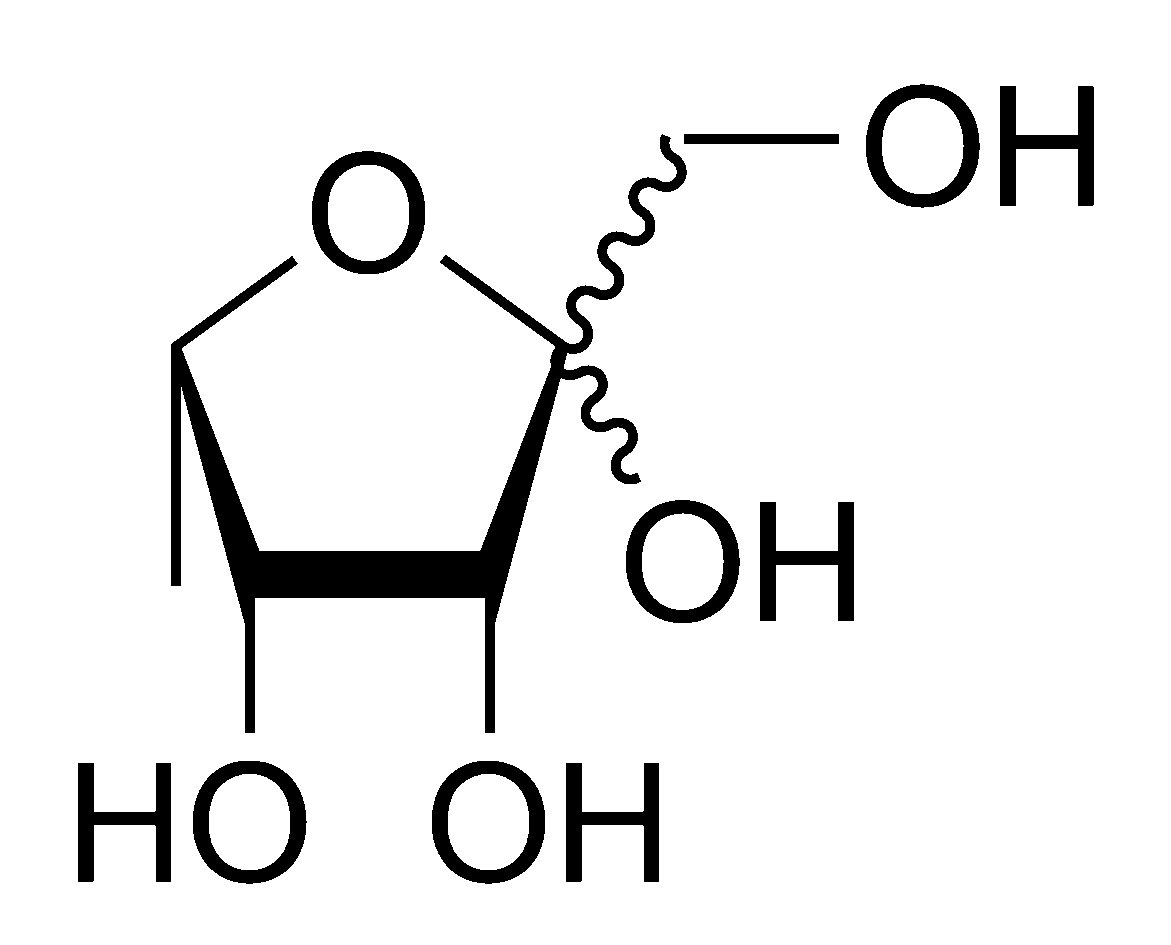

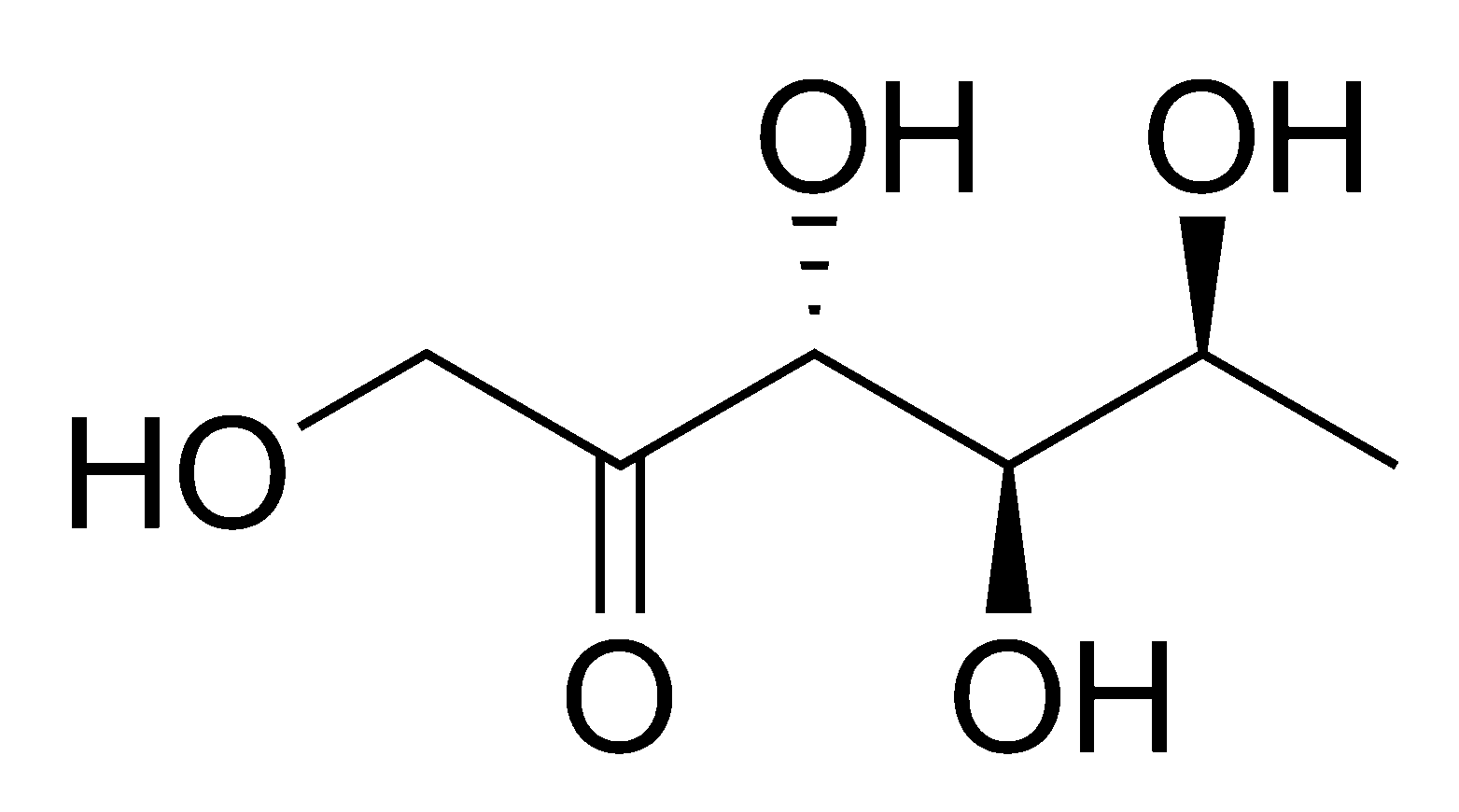

Names
- IUPAC name 6-Deoxy-l-tagatose
- Systematic IUPAC name (3R,4S,5S)-2-(Hydroxymethyl)-5-methyltetrahydrofuran-2,3,4-triol

Identifiers
CAS Number	13074-08-3
3D model (JSmol)	Interactive image
ChEBI	CHEBI:17617
ChemSpider	9621375
KEGG	C01721
PubChem CID	6857362
CompTox Dashboard (EPA)	DTXSID30926880
- InChI: InChI=1S/C6H12O5/c1-3(8)5(10)6(11)4(9)2-7/h3,5-8,10-11H,2H2,1H3/t3-,5+,6-/m0/s1 Key: QZNPNKJXABGCRC-LFRDXLMFSA-N
- SMILES: O[C@H]1[C@@H](O)C(O)(CO)O[C@H]1C

Properties
Chemical formula	C_{6}H_{12}O_{5}
Molar mass	164.157 g·mol^{−1}
- Except where otherwise noted, data are given for materials in their standard state (at 25 °C [77 °F], 100 kPa). verify (what is ?) Infobox references

Fuculose or 6-deoxy-tagatose is a ketohexose deoxy sugar. Fuculose is involved in the process of sugar metabolism. l-Fuculose can be formed from l-fucose by l-fucose isomerase and converted to L-fuculose-1-phosphate by l-fuculose kinase.

== See also ==
- l-Fuculose-phosphate aldolase
- l-Fuculosekinase
