= Gab operon =

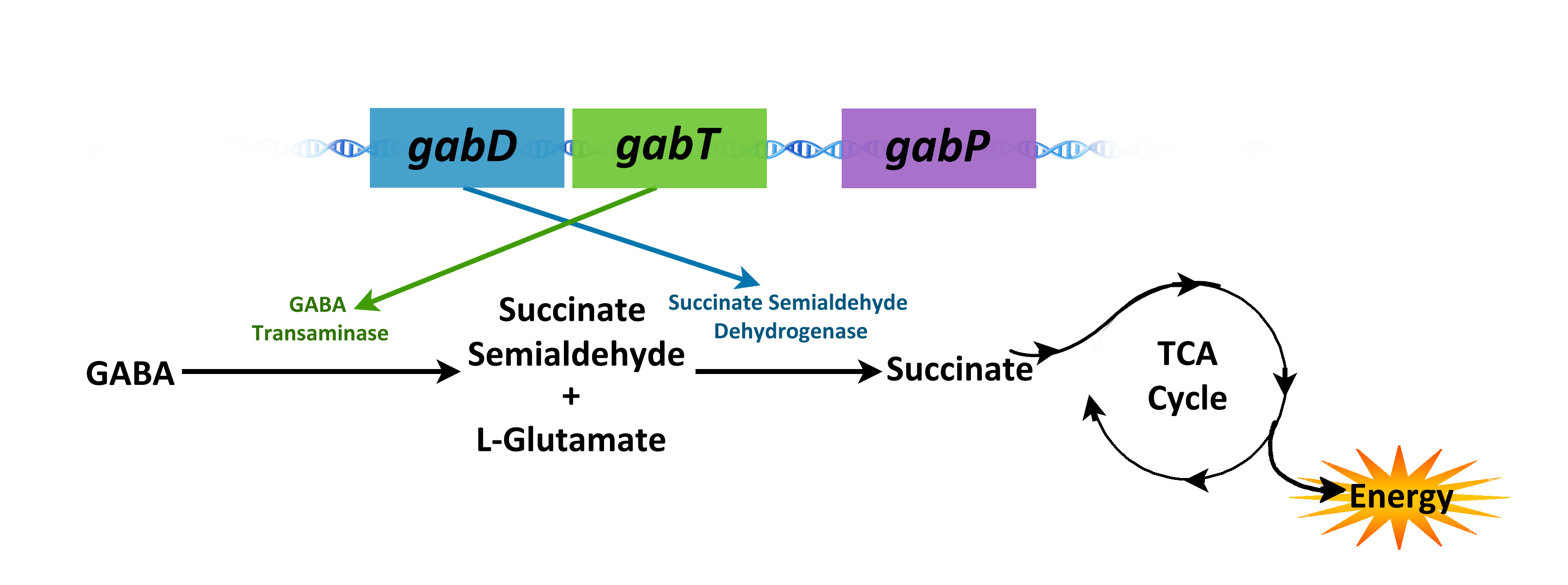
GABA degradation mechanism

The gab operon is responsible for the conversion of γ-aminobutyrate (GABA) to succinate. The gab operon comprises three structural genes – gabD, gabT and gabP – that encode for a succinate semialdehyde dehydrogenase, GABA transaminase and a GABA permease respectively. There is a regulatory gene csiR, downstream of the operon, that codes for a putative transcriptional repressor and is activated when nitrogen is limiting.

The gab operon has been characterized in Escherichia coli and significant homologies for the enzymes have been found in organisms such as Saccharomyces cerevisiae, rats and humans.

Limited nitrogen conditions activate the gab genes. The enzymes produced by these genes convert GABA to succinate, which then enters the TCA cycle, to be used as a source of energy. The gab operon is also known to contribute to polyamine homeostasis during nitrogen-limited growth and to maintain high internal glutamate concentrations under stress conditions.

== Structure ==
The gab operon consists of three structural genes:

- gabT : encodes a GABA transaminase that produces succinic semialdehyde.
- gabD : encodes an NADP-dependent succinic semialdehyde dehydrogenase, which oxidizes succinic semialdehyde to succinate.
- gabP : encodes a GABA-specific permease.

== Physiological significance of the operon ==
The gabT gene encodes for GABA transaminase, an enzyme that catalyzes the conversion of GABA and 2-oxoglutarate into succinate semialdehyde and glutamate. Succinate semialdehyde is then oxidized into succinate by succinate semialdehyde dehydrogenase which is encoded by the gabP gene, thereby entering the TCA cycle as a usable source of energy. The gab operon contributes to homeostasis of polyamines such as putrescine, during nitrogen-limited growth. It is also known to maintain high internal glutamate concentrations under stress conditions.

== Regulation ==
=== Differential regulation of promoters ===
The expression of genes in the operon is controlled by three differentially regulated promoters, two of which are controlled by RpoS encoded sigma factor σ^{S}.

- csiD_{p} : is σ^{S}-dependent and is activated exclusively upon carbon starvation because cAMP-CRP acts an essential activator for σ^{S} containing RNA polymerase at the csiD promoter.
- gabD_{p1}: is σ^{S} -dependent and is induced by multiple stresses.
- gabD_{p2}: is σ^{70} dependent and is controlled by Nac (Nitrogen Assimilation Control) regulatory proteins expressed under nitrogen limitation.

=== Mechanism of regulation ===
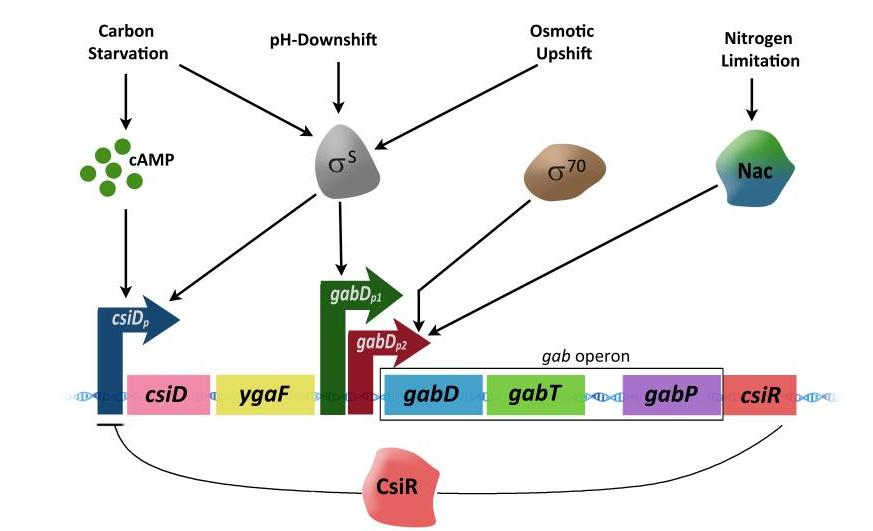
Structure and regulatory mechanism of the gab operon.

==== Activation ====
The csiD promoter (csiD_{p}) is essential for the expression of csiD(carbon starvation induced gene), ygaF and the gab genes. The csiD_{p} is activated exclusively under carbon starvation conditions and stationary phase during which cAMP accumulates in high concentrations in the cell. The binding of cAMP to the cAMP receptor protein(CRP) causes CRP to bind tightly to a specific DNA site in the csiD_{p} promoter, thus activating the transcription of genes downstream of the promoter.

The gabD_{p1} exerts an additional control over the gabDTP region. The gabD_{p1} is activated by σ^{S} inducing conditions such as hyperosmotic and acidic shifts besides starvation and stationary phase. The gabD_{p2} promoter on the other hand, is σ^{70} dependent and is activated under nitrogen limitation. In nitrogen limiting conditions, the nitrogen regulator Nac binds to a site located just upstream of the promoter expressing the gab genes. The gab genes upon activation produce enzymes that degrade GABA to succinate.

==== Repression ====
The presence of nitrogen activates the csiR gene located downstream of the gabP gene. The csiR gene encodes a protein that acts as a transcriptional repressor for csiD-ygaF-gab operon hence shutting off the GABA degradation pathway.

== Eukaryotic analogue ==
GABA degradation pathways exists in almost all eukaryotic organisms and takes place by the action of similar enzymes. Although GABA in E. coli is predominantly used as an alternative source of energy through GABA degradation pathways, GABA in higher eukaryotic organisms acts as an inhibitory neurotransmitter and also as regulator of muscle tone. GABA degradation pathways in eukaryotes are responsible for the inactivation of GABA.
