= Catabolite Control Protein A =

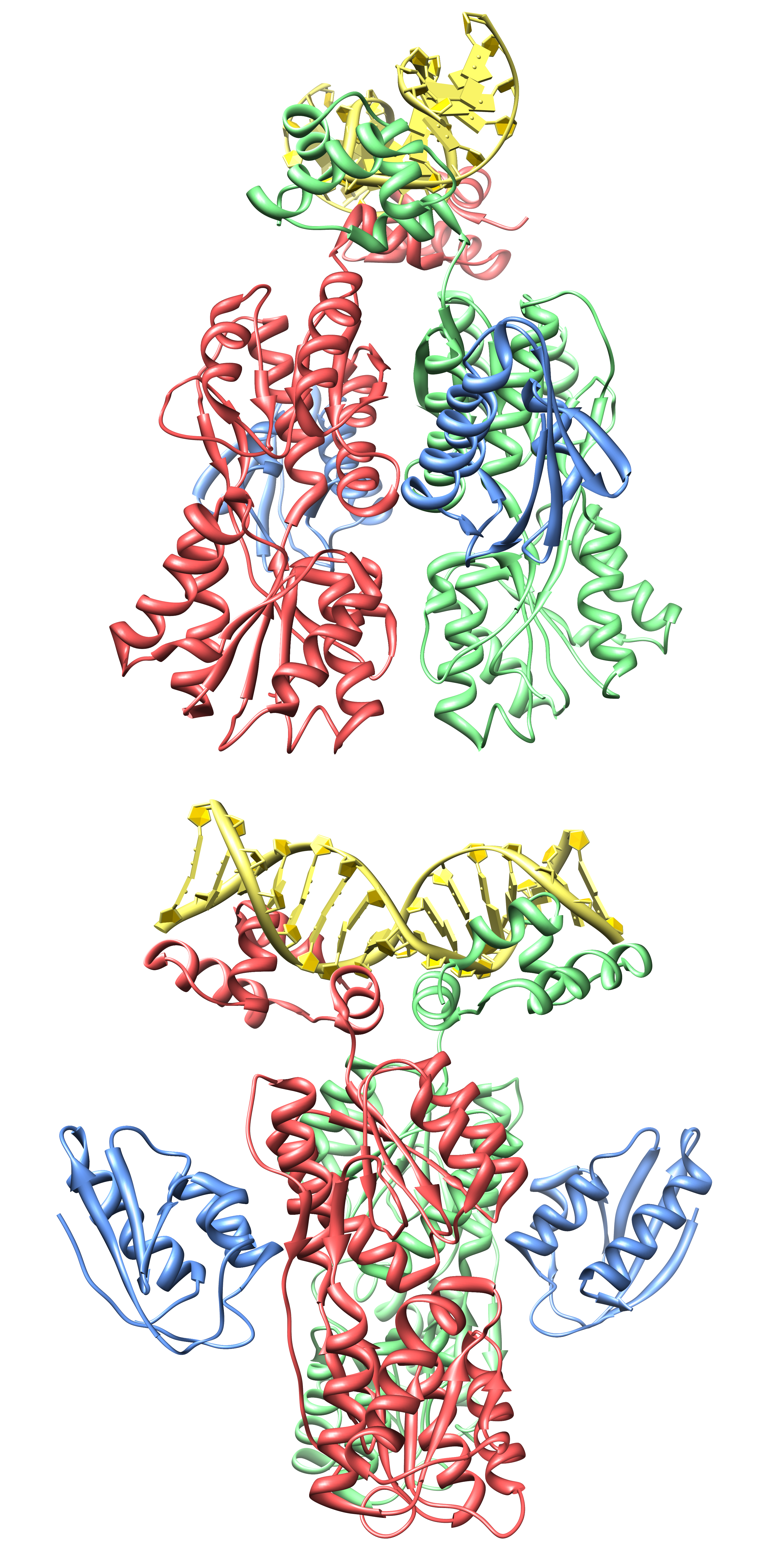
Front (top) and side (bottom) views of the structure (PDB: 1rzr) of CcpA (green and red) in complex with co-regulator Hpr-Ser46-P (blue) and target (operator) DNA sequence (gold). CcpA binds DNA as a homodimer (green and red monomer chains) in the N-terminal region of the protein. Binding is modulated allosterically by binding of Hpr-Ser46-P (blue) and small molecule ligands (not shown).

Catabolite Control Protein A (CcpA) is a master regulator of carbon metabolism in gram-positive bacteria. It is a member of the LacI/GalR transcription regulator family. In contrast to most LacI/GalR proteins, CcpA is allosterically regulated principally by a protein-protein interaction, rather than a protein-small molecule interaction. CcpA interacts with the phosphorylated form of Hpr and Crh, which is formed when high concentrations of glucose or fructose-1,6-bisphosphate are present in the cell. Interaction of Hpr or Crh modulates the DNA sequence specificity of CcpA, allowing it to bind operator DNA to modulate transcription. Small molecules glucose-6-phosphate and fructose-1,6-bisphosphate are also known allosteric effectors, fine-tuning CcpA function.

== Structure ==
The DNA-binding functional unit of CcpA consists of a homodimer. The N-terminal region of each monomer form a DNA-binding site while the C-terminal portion forms a "regulatory" domain. A short linker connects the N-terminal DNA binding domain and the C-terminal regulatory domain, which partially contacts DNA when bound. The LacI/GalR subfamily can be functionally subdivided based on the presence or absence of a "YxxPxxxAxxL" motif in the linker sequence; CcpA belongs to the subdivision containing this motif. The regulatory domain is further subdivided into a N-terminal and C-terminal subdomain. Small molecule effector binding occurs in the cleft between these subdomains. Binding to phosphorylated Hpr/Crh occurs along the regulatory domain's N-subdomain.
