= L-Fuculokinase =

Class of enzymes

Identifiers
- EC no.: 2.7.1.51
- CAS no.: 9026-64-6

Databases
- IntEnz: IntEnz view
- BRENDA: BRENDA entry
- ExPASy: NiceZyme view
- KEGG: KEGG entry
- MetaCyc: metabolic pathway
- PRIAM: profile
- PDB structures: RCSB PDB PDBe PDBsum
- Gene Ontology: AmiGO / QuickGO
Search
- PMC: articles
- PubMed: articles
- NCBI: proteins

L-Fuculokinase (EC 2.7.1.51) is an enzyme that catalyzes the chemical reaction

ATP +
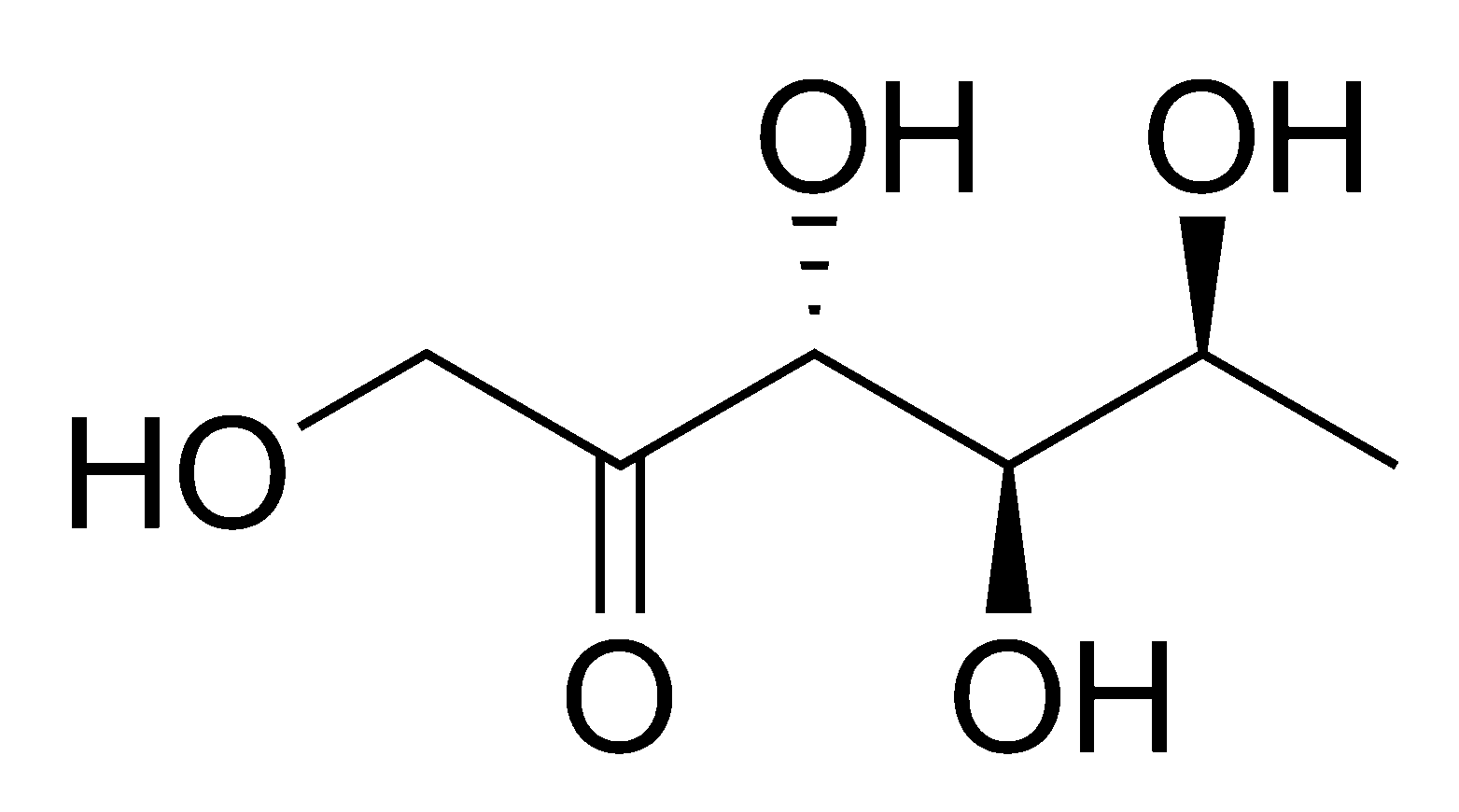
fuculose
ADP +
L-fuculose 1-phosphate

The enzyme characterised from Escherichia coli converts the deoxy sugar, L-fuculose, to L-fuculose 1-phosphate by transferring a phosphate group from the cofactor, adenosine triphosphate (ATP), which is converted to adenosine diphosphate (ADP). The gene name used for the gene that encodes L-fuculokinase is fucK.

L-Fuculokinase is a transferase, specifically one transferring phosphorus-containing groups (phosphotransferases) with an alcohol group as acceptor. The systematic name of this enzyme class is ATP:L-fuculose 1-phosphotransferase. Other names in common use include L-fuculokinase (phosphorylating), and L-fuculose kinase. This enzyme participates in fructose and mannose metabolism.
