= Catabolite repression =

Metabolic process in microorganisms

Carbon catabolite repression, or simply catabolite repression, is an important part of global control system of various bacteria and other microorganisms. Catabolite repression allows microorganisms to adapt quickly to a preferred (rapidly metabolizable) carbon and energy source first. This is usually achieved through inhibition of synthesis of enzymes involved in catabolism of carbon sources other than the preferred one. The catabolite repression was first shown to be initiated by glucose and therefore sometimes referred to as the glucose effect. However, the term "glucose effect" is actually a misnomer since other carbon sources are known to induce catabolite repression.

It was discovered by Frédéric Diénert in 1900. Jacques Monod provides a bibliography of pre-1940 literature.

== Escherichia coli ==
Catabolite repression was extensively studied in Escherichia coli. E. coli grows faster on glucose than on any other carbon source. For example, if E. coli is placed on an agar plate containing only glucose and lactose, the bacteria will use glucose first and lactose second. When glucose is available in the environment, the synthesis of β-galactosidase is under repression due to the effect of catabolite repression caused by glucose. The catabolite repression in this case is achieved through the utilization of phosphotransferase system.

An important enzyme from the phosphotransferase system called Enzyme II A (EIIA) plays a central role in this mechanism. There are different catabolite-specific EIIA in a single cell, even though different bacterial groups have specificities to different sets of catabolites. In enteric bacteria one of the EIIA enzymes in their set is specific for glucose transport only. When glucose levels are high inside the bacteria, EIIA mostly exists in its unphosphorylated form. This leads to inhibition of adenylyl cyclase and lactose permease, therefore cAMP levels are low and lactose can not be transported inside the bacteria.

Once the glucose is all used up, the second preferred carbon source (i.e. lactose) has to be used by bacteria. Absence of glucose will "turn off" catabolite repression. When glucose levels are low, the phosphorylated form of EIIA accumulates and consequently activates the enzyme adenylyl cyclase, which will produce high levels of cAMP. cAMP binds to catabolite activator protein (CAP) and together they will bind to a promoter sequence on the lac operon. However, this is not enough for the lactose genes to be transcribed. Lactose must be present inside the cell to remove the lactose repressor from the operator sequence (transcriptional regulation). When these two conditions are satisfied, it means for the bacteria that glucose is absent and lactose is available. Next, bacteria start to transcribe the lac operon and produce β-galactosidase enzymes for lactose metabolism. The example above is a simplification of a complex process. Catabolite repression is considered to be a part of global control system and therefore it affects more genes rather than just lactose gene transcription.

== Bacillus subtilis ==
Gram positive bacteria such as Bacillus subtilis have a cAMP-independent catabolite repression mechanism controlled by catabolite control protein A (CcpA). In this alternative pathway CcpA negatively represses other sugar operons so they are off in the presence of glucose. It works by the fact that Hpr is phosphorylated by a specific mechanism, when glucose enters through the cell membrane protein EIIC, and when Hpr is phosphorylated it can then allow CcpA to block transcription of the alternative sugar pathway operons at their respective cre sequence binding sites. Note that E. coli has a similar cAMP-independent catabolite repression mechanism that utilizes a protein called catabolite repressor activator (Cra).
