= Gal operon =

Operon

The gal operon is a prokaryotic operon, which encodes enzymes necessary for galactose metabolism. Repression of gene expression for this operon works via binding of repressor molecules to two operators. These repressors dimerize, creating a loop in the DNA. The loop as well as hindrance from the external operator prevent RNA polymerase from binding to the promoter, and thus prevent transcription. Additionally, since the metabolism of galactose in the cell is involved in both anabolic and catabolic pathways, a novel regulatory system using two promoters for differential repression has been identified and characterized within the context of the gal operon.

== Structure ==
The gal operon of E. coli consists of 4 structural genes: galE (epimerase), galT (galactose transferase), galK (galactokinase), and galM (mutarotase) which are transcribed from two overlapping promoters, PG1 (+1) and PG2 (-5), upstream from galE. GalE encodes for an epimerase that converts UDP-glucose into UDP-galactose. This is required for the formation of UDP-galactose for cell wall biosynthesis, in particular the cell wall component lipopolysaccharide, even when cells are not using galactose as a carbon/energy source. GalT encodes for the protein galactosyltransferase which catalyzes the transfer of a galactose sugar to an acceptor, forming a glycosidic bond. GalK encodes for a kinase that phosphorylates α-D-galactose to galactose 1-phosphate. Lastly, galM catalyzes the conversion of β-D-galactose to α-D-galactose as the first step in galactose metabolism.

The gal operon contains two operators, O_{E} (for external) and O_{I} (for internal). The former is just upstream of the promoter, and the latter is just after the galE gene (the first gene in the operon). These operators bind the repressor, GalR, which is encoded from outside the operator region. For this repressor protein to function properly, the operon also contains a histone binding site to facilitate this process.

An additional site, known as the activating site, is found following the external operator, but upstream of PG2. This site serves as the binding region for the cAMP-CRP complex, which modulates the activity of the promoters and thus, gene expression.

== Regulation ==
=== galR ===
The unlinked galR gene encodes the repressor for this system. A tetrameric GalR repressor binds to 2 operators, one located at +55 and one located at -60 relative to the PG1 start site. Looping of the DNA blocks the access of RNA polymerase to promoters and/or inhibits formation of the open complex. This looping requires the presence of the histone-like protein, HU to facilitate the formation of the structure and allow for proper repression. When GalR binds as a dimer to the -60 site only, the promoter PG2 is activated, not repressed, allowing basal levels of GalE to be produced. In this state, the PG1 promoter is inactivated through interactions with the alpha subunit of RNA polymerase. Activity of this repressor protein is controlled based on the levels of D-galactose in the cell. Increased levels of this sugar inhibit the activity of the repressor by binding allosterically, resulting in a conformational change of the protein, which suppresses its interactions with RNA polymerase and DNA. This induces the activity of the operon, which will increase the rate of galactose metabolism.

Along with the structurally similar lac repressor LacI, GalR is a prototypical member of the LacI/GalR family of transcriptional regulators, mostly allosterically controlled. Via their actions on GalR, galactose and fucose are inducers of the gal operon and IPTG is an anti-inducer.

10.1038/srep27672

=== CRP-cAMP ===
The gal operon is also controlled by CRP-cAMP, similarly to the lac operon. CRP-cAMP binds to the -35 region, promoting transcription from PG1 but inhibiting transcription from PG2. This is accomplished due to the location of the activation sequence. When CRP-cAMP binds the activating sequence, it blocks RNA polymerase from establishing an open complex with PG2, but enhances a closed complex with RNA polymerase at PG1. This represses the activity of the PG2 promoter, and increases the activity of the PG1 promoter. When cells are grown in glucose, basal level transcription occurs from PG2.

== See also ==
- lac operon
