= CAMP receptor protein =

Regulatory protein in bacteria

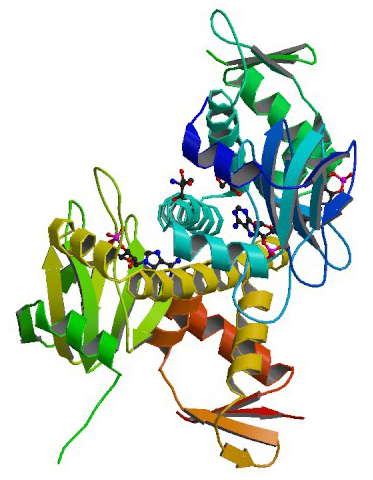
- Structure of the E. coli Cyclic AMP Receptor Protein.

Identifiers
- Symbol: CRP
- Alt. symbols: CAP
- NCBI gene: 947867
- PDB: 1I5Z
- RefSeq: NP_417816.1
- UniProt: P0ACJ8
Search for
- Structures: Swiss-model
- Domains: InterPro

cAMP receptor protein (CRP), also known as catabolite activator protein (CAP), is a bacterial transcription factor that regulates gene expression in response to intracellular levels of cyclic adenosine monophosphate (cAMP). Binding of cAMP induces a conformational change that enables CRP to bind specific DNA sequences and regulate transcription through interactions with RNA polymerase. CRP plays a central role in catabolite repression, coordinating the expression of genes involved in carbon-source utilization and energy metabolism.

== Structure ==
CRP is a homodimer composed of two identical subunits, each containing an N-terminal cAMP-binding domain (residues 1–138) and a C-terminal DNA-binding domain (residues 139–209). Each subunit binds cAMP, with the two binding events exhibiting negative cooperativity.

The C-terminal domain contains a helix-turn-helix motif that recognizes specific DNA sequences through interactions with the major groove of DNA. Binding of CRP induces a pronounced bend of approximately 90° in the DNA, contributing to the formation of transcriptional regulatory complexes.

== Function ==
CAP's name reflects the protein's ability to affect transcription of genes involved in many catabolic pathways. For example, when the amount of glucose transported into a cell is low, a cascade of events results in the increase of cAMP levels in the cell's cytosol, and this increase in cAMP levels is sensed by CAP, which goes on to activate the transcription of many other catabolic genes.

The genes regulated by CRP are mostly involved in energy metabolism, such as galactose, citrate, or the PEP group translocation system. In Escherichia coli, CRP can regulate the transcription of more than 100 genes.

One example of the role of CAP is its criticality in activating the ability of E. coli to metabolize lactose. The cAMP-CAP complex allows RNA polymerase to bind to the lac operon and transcribe its genes, which encode the proteins required for breaking down lactose into glucose and galactose. Regulation of the lac operon is vital for E. coli because glucose is more easily metabolized—and is therefore a more economical source of carbon—than lactose. So the cell "prefers" glucose, and its presence causes the lac operon to be repressed regardless how much lactose may be available.

Such conditional turning off of genes for metabolizing less-preferred substances, known as catabolite repression, is common in bacteria, and CAP plays an important role in it. Besides its function in activating the lac operon, CAP has a similar role in the Mal regulon, controlling the expression of malT, a gene critical in the uptake and metabolism of maltodextrins.

== Mechanism of action ==
Binding of cAMP to CRP induces an allosteric conformational change that increases its affinity for specific DNA sequences. This involves transmission of a structural signal from the N-terminal cAMP-binding domain to the C-terminal DNA-binding domain.

The cAMP–CRP complex activates transcription through direct interactions with RNA polymerase, primarily by facilitating its recruitment to target promoters. The molecular mechanism varies according to the organization of the promoter and the position of the CRP-binding site.

At "Class I" CRP-dependent promoters, CRP binds to a DNA site located upstream of core promoter elements and activates transcription through protein–protein interactions between "activating region 1" of CRP and the C-terminal domain of RNA polymerase alpha subunit. At "Class II" CRP-dependent promoters, CRP binds to a DNA site that overlaps the promoter -35 element and activates transcription through two sets of protein–protein interactions: (1) an interaction between "activating region 1" of CRP and the C-terminal domain of RNA polymerase alpha subunit, and (2) an interaction between "activating region 2" of CRP and the N-terminal domain of RNA polymerase alpha subunit. At "Class III" CRP-dependent promoters, CRP functions together with one or more "co-activator" proteins.

At most CRP-dependent promoters, CRP activates transcription primarily or exclusively through a "recruitment" mechanism, in which protein–protein interactions between CRP and RNA polymerase assist binding of RNA polymerase to the promoter.

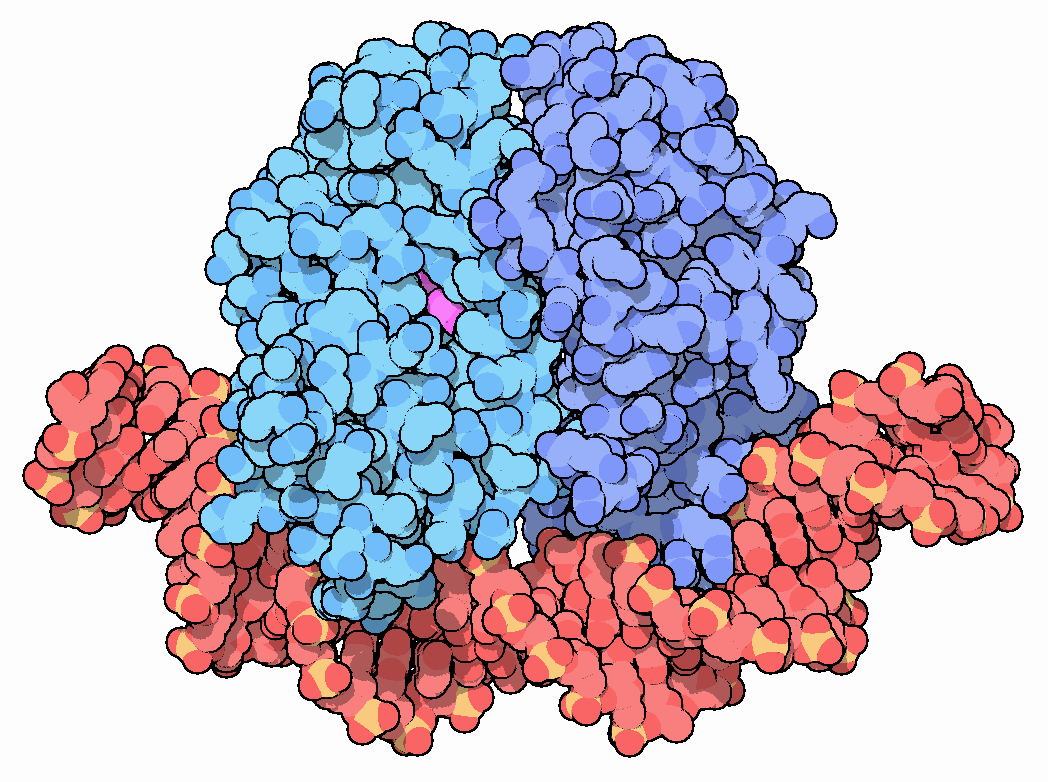
Catabolite Activator Protein (blue) bound to a piece of DNA (red).

With its cyclic-AMP ligand, CAP binds a DNA region upstream from the site at which RNA polymerase binds and activates transcription through protein-protein interactions with RNA polymerase's α-subunit. This protein-protein interaction both catalyzes the formation of the RNAP-promoter closed complex and isomerizes the RNAP-promoter complex to the open conformation.
