= Ribulose =

Monosaccharide with five carbon atoms and a ketone functional group

d-Ribulose
- Haworth projection of β-d-ribulofuranose

Names
- IUPAC name d-erythro-Pent-2-ulose
- Systematic IUPAC name (3R,4R)-1,3,4,5-Tetrahydroxypentan-2-one
- Other names d-erythro-2-Pentulose; Adonose; Arabinulose; Araboketose; Ribosone

Identifiers
| CAS Number | 488-84-6 (d); 2042-27-5 (l); 5556-48-9 (dl) |
| 3D model (JSmol) | (d): Interactive image; (l): Interactive image |
| ChEBI | CHEBI:28721; CHEBI:17173 (D); CHEBI:16880 (L) |
| ChemSpider | 133316 |
| KEGG | C05052; C00309 (D); C00508 (L) |
| PubChem CID | 619; 151261 (D); 644111 (L) |
| UNII | Z7U4KG0138 (d); 202306UV02 (l); DJM6K5T6YA (dl) |
- InChI: InChI=1S/C5H10O5/c6-1-3(8)5(10)4(9)2-7/h3,5-8,10H,1-2H2/t3-,5-/m1/s1 Key: ZAQJHHRNXZUBTE-NQXXGFSBSA-N; InChI=1/C5H10O5/c6-1-3(8)5(10)4(9)2-7/h3,5-8,10H,1-2H2/t3-,5-/m1/s1 Key: ZAQJHHRNXZUBTE-NQXXGFSBBP
- SMILES: (d): C([C@H]([C@H](C(=O)CO)O)O)O; (l): OCC([C@@H](O)[C@@H](O)CO)=O

Properties
| Chemical formula | C_{5}H_{10}O_{5} |
| Molar mass | 150.130 g·mol^{−1} |
- Except where otherwise noted, data are given for materials in their standard state (at 25 °C [77 °F], 100 kPa). verify (what is ?) Infobox references

Ribulose is a ketopentose — a monosaccharide containing five carbon atoms, and including a ketone functional group. It has chemical formula C_{5}H_{10}O_{5}. Two enantiomers are possible, d-ribulose (d-erythro-pentulose) and l-ribulose (l-erythro-pentulose). d-Ribulose is the diastereomer of d-xylulose.

Ribulose sugars are composed in the pentose phosphate pathway from arabinose. They are important in the formation of many bioactive substances. For example, d-ribulose is an intermediate in the fungal pathway for d-arabitol production. Also, as the 1,5-bisphosphate, d-ribulose combines with carbon dioxide at the start of the photosynthesis process in green plants (carbon dioxide trap).

Ribulose has the same stereochemistry at carbons 3 and 4 as the five-carbon aldoses ribose and arabinose.

Stereoisomers of D-ribulose in the Haworth projection
