= Arabinose =

Names
- IUPAC name Arabinose
- Systematic IUPAC name arabino-Pentose
- Other names Pectinose

Identifiers
CAS Number	147-81-9; 10323-20-3 (D); 5328-37-0 (L)
3D model (JSmol)	Interactive image; Interactive image
ChEBI	CHEBI:46983
ChemSpider	59687
EC Number	205-699-8
PubChem CID	5460291
UNII	509X20752R; F0W6ETZ4E5 (D); B40ROO395Z (L)
- InChI: InChI=1S/C5H10O5/c6-1-3(8)5(10)4(9)2-7/h1,3-5,7-10H,2H2/t3-,4-,5+/m1/s1 Key: PYMYPHUHKUWMLA-WDCZJNDASA-N; InChI=1/C5H10O5/c6-1-3(8)5(10)4(9)2-7/h1,3-5,7-10H,2H2/t3-,4-,5+/m1/s1 Key: PYMYPHUHKUWMLA-WDCZJNDABW
- SMILES: O=C[C@@H](O)[C@H](O)[C@H](O)CO; C([C@H]([C@H]([C@@H](C=O)O)O)O)O

Properties
Chemical formula	C_{5}H_{10}O_{5}
Molar mass	150.13 g/mol
Appearance	Colorless crystals as prisms or needles
Density	1.585 g/cm^{3} (20 °C)
Melting point	164 to 165 °C (327 to 329 °F; 437 to 438 K)
Solubility in water	834 g/1 L (25 °C (77 °F))
Magnetic susceptibility (χ)	−85.70·10^{−6} cm^{3}/mol

Hazards
NFPA 704 (fire diamond)	1 1 0

Related compounds
Related aldopentoses	Ribose; Xylose; Lyxose
- Except where otherwise noted, data are given for materials in their standard state (at 25 °C [77 °F], 100 kPa). verify (what is ?) Infobox references

Arabinose is an aldopentose – a monosaccharide containing five carbon atoms, and including an aldehyde (CHO) functional group.

== Properties ==
For biosynthetic reasons, most saccharides are almost always more abundant in nature as the "D"-form, or structurally analogous to D-glyceraldehyde. (Note: The D/L nomenclature does not refer to the molecule's optical rotation properties but to its structural analogy to glyceraldehyde.) However, L-arabinose is in fact more common than D-arabinose in nature and is found in nature as a component of biopolymers such as hemicellulose and pectin.

The L-arabinose operon, also known as the araBAD operon, has been the subject of much biomolecular research. The operon directs the catabolism of arabinose in E. coli, and it is dynamically activated in the presence of arabinose and the absence of glucose.

A classic method for the organic synthesis of arabinose from glucose is the Wohl degradation.

D-Arabinose
α-D-Arabinofuranose	β-D-Arabinofuranose
α-D-Arabinopyranose	β-D-Arabinopyranose

== Etymology ==
Arabinose gets its name from gum arabic, from which it was first isolated.

== Use in foods ==
Originally commercialized as a sweetener, arabinose is an inhibitor of sucrase, the enzyme that breaks down sucrose into glucose and fructose in the small intestine.

== See also ==
- Arabinosyl nucleosides
