= Exome =

Sequences remaining within RNA after RNA splicing

The exome is composed of all of the exons within the genome, the sequences which, when transcribed, remain within the mature RNA after introns are removed by RNA splicing. This includes untranslated regions of messenger RNA (mRNA), and coding regions. Exome sequencing has proven to be an efficient method of determining the genetic basis of more than two dozen Mendelian or single gene disorders.

== Statistics ==
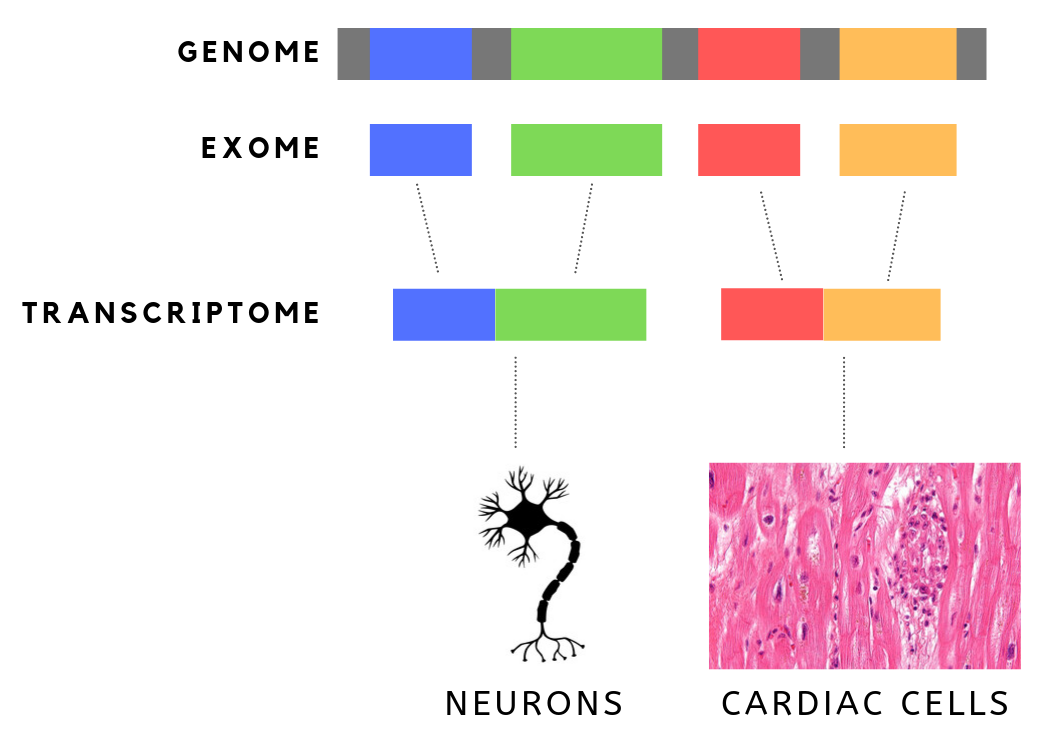
Distinction between genome, exome, and transcriptome. The exome consists of all of the exons within the genome. In contrast, the trascriptome varies between cell types (e.g. neurons vs cardiac cells), only involving a portion of the exons that are actually transcribed into mRNA.

The human exome consists of roughly 233,785 exons, about 80% of which are less than 200 base pairs in length, constituting a total of about 1.1% of the total genome, or about 30 megabases of DNA. Though composing a very small fraction of the genome, mutations in the exome are thought to harbor 85% of mutations that have a large effect on disease.

== Definition ==
The exome is distinct from the transcriptome, which is all of the transcribed RNA within a cell type. While the exome is constant from cell-type to cell-type, the transcriptome changes based on the structure and function of the cells. As a result, the entirety of the exome is not translated into protein in every cell. Different cell types only transcribe portions of the exome, and only the coding regions of the exons are eventually translated into proteins.

== Next-generation sequencing ==
Next-generation sequencing (NGS) allows for the rapid sequencing of large amounts of DNA, significantly advancing the study of genetics, and replacing older methods such as Sanger sequencing. This technology is starting to become more common in healthcare and research not only because it is a reliable method of determining genetic variations, but also because it is cost effective and allows researchers to sequence entire genomes in anywhere between days to weeks. This compares to former methods which may have taken months. Next-gen sequencing includes both whole-exome sequencing and whole-genome sequencing.

=== Whole-exome sequencing ===
Sequencing an individual's exome instead of their entire genome has been proposed to be a more cost-effective and efficient way to diagnose rare genetic disorders. It has also been found to be more effective than other methods such as karyotyping and microarrays. This distinction is largely due to the fact that phenotypes of genetic disorders are a result of mutated exons. In addition, since the exome only comprises 1.5% of the total genome, this process is more cost efficient and fast as it involves sequencing around 40 million bases rather than the 3 billion base pairs that make up the genome.

=== Whole-genome sequencing ===
On the other hand, whole genome sequencing has been found to capture a more comprehensive view of variants in the DNA compared to whole-exome sequencing. Especially for single nucleotide variants, whole genome sequencing is more powerful and more sensitive than whole-exome sequencing in detecting potentially disease-causing mutations within the exome. One must also keep in mind that non-coding regions can be involved in the regulation of the exons that make up the exome, and so whole-exome sequencing may not be complete in showing all the sequences at play in forming the exome.

=== Ethical considerations ===
With either form of sequencing, whole-exome sequencing or whole genome sequencing, some have argued that such practices should be done under the consideration of medical ethics. While physicians strive to preserve patient autonomy, sequencing deliberately asks laboratories to look at genetic variants that may be completely unrelated to the patient's condition at hand and have the potential of revealing findings that were not intentionally sought. In addition, such testing have been suggested to have imply forms of discrimination against particular groups for having certain genes, creating the potential for stigmas or negative attitudes towards that group as a result.

== Diseases and diagnoses ==
Rare mutations that affect the function of essential proteins constitute the majority of Mendelian diseases. In addition, the overwhelming majority of disease-causing mutations in Mendelian loci can be found within the coding region. With the goal of finding methods to best detect harmful mutations and successfully diagnose patients, researchers are looking to the exome for clues to aid in this process.

Whole-exome sequencing is a recent technology that has led to the discovery of various genetic disorders and increased the rate of diagnoses of patients with rare genetic disorders. Overall, whole-exome sequencing has allowed healthcare providers to diagnose 30–50% of patients who were thought to have rare Mendelian disorders. It has been suggested that whole-exome sequencing in clinical settings has many unexplored advantages. Not only can the exome increase our understanding of genetic patterns, but under clinical settings, it has the potential to the change in management of patients with rare and previously unknown disorders, allowing physicians to develop more targeted and personalized interventions.

For example, Bartter Syndrome, also known as salt-wasting nephropathy, is a hereditary disease of the kidney characterized by hypotension (low blood pressure), hypokalemia (low potassium), and alkalosis (high blood pH) leading to muscle fatigue and varying levels of fatality. It is an example of a rare disease, affecting fewer than one per million people, whose patients have been positively impacted by whole-exome sequencing. Thanks to this method, patients who formerly did not exhibit the classical mutations associated with Bartter Syndrome were formally diagnosed with it after the discovery that the disease has mutations outside of the loci of interest. They were thus able to gain more targeted and productive treatment for the disease.

Much of the focus of exome sequencing in the context of disease diagnosis has been on protein coding "loss of function" alleles. Research has shown, however, that future advances that allow the study of non-coding regions, within and without the exome, may lead to additional abilities in the diagnoses of rare Mendelian disorders. The exome is the part of the genome composed of exons, the sequences which, when transcribed, remain within the mature RNA after introns are removed by RNA splicing and contribute to the final protein product encoded by that gene. It consists of all DNA that is transcribed into mature RNA in cells of any type, as distinct from the transcriptome, which is the RNA that has been transcribed only in a specific cell population. The exome of the human genome consists of roughly 180,000 exons constituting about 1% of the total genome, or about 30 megabases of DNA. Though composing a very small fraction of the genome, mutations in the exome are thought to harbor 85% of mutations that have a large effect on disease. Exome sequencing has proved to be an efficient strategy to determine the genetic basis of more than two dozen Mendelian or single gene disorders.

== See also ==
- Coding strand
- Exome sequencing
- Gene structure
- Non-coding DNA
- Non-coding RNA
- Transcriptome
- Transcriptomics
