= Atlas of UTR Regulatory Activity =

Biological database

AURA
Content
- Description: Atlas of UTR Regulatory Activity

Contact
- Research center: CIBIO - University of Trento
- Laboratory: Laboratory of Translational Genomics
- Authors: Erik Dassi, Andrea Malossini, Angela Re, Tommaso Mazza, Toma Tebaldi, Luigi Caputi and Alessandro Quattrone
- Release date: 2014

Access
- Website: aura.science.unitn.it

The Atlas of UTR Regulatory Activity (AURA), a biological database, now in its second version, is a manually curated and comprehensive catalog of human 5' and 3' untranslated sequences (UTR) and UTR regulatory annotations. It includes basic annotation, phylogenetic conservation, binding sites for RNA-binding proteins and miRNAs, cis-elements, RNA methylation and editing data. This data is accessible through a web interface and through data-mining approaches. Batch analysis of gene lists is also possible.

== See also ==
- Five prime untranslated region
- MiRNA
- RNA-binding protein
- Three prime untranslated region
- Untranslated region
