= Regulatory sequence =

Segment of nucleic acid that affects the expression of associated genes

A regulatory sequence is a segment of a nucleic acid molecule which is capable of increasing or decreasing the expression of specific genes within an organism. Regulation of gene expression is an essential feature of all living organisms and viruses.

== Description ==
The structure of a eukaryotic protein-coding gene. Regulatory sequence controls when and where expression occurs for the protein coding region (red). Promoter and enhancer regions (yellow) regulate the transcription of the gene into a pre-mRNA which is modified to remove introns (light grey) and add a 5' cap and poly-A tail (dark grey). The mRNA 5' and 3' untranslated regions (blue) regulate translation into the final protein product.

In DNA, regulation of gene expression normally happens at the level of RNA biosynthesis (transcription). It is accomplished through the sequence-specific binding of proteins (transcription factors) that activate or inhibit transcription. Transcription factors may act as activators, repressors, or both. Repressors often act by preventing RNA polymerase from forming a productive complex with the transcriptional initiation region (promoter), while activators facilitate formation of a productive complex. Furthermore, DNA motifs have been shown to be predictive of epigenomic modifications, suggesting that transcription factors play a role in regulating the epigenome.

The structure of a prokaryotic operon of protein-coding genes. Regulatory sequence controls when expression occurs for the multiple protein coding regions (red). Promoter, operator and enhancer regions (yellow) regulate the transcription of the gene into an mRNA. The mRNA untranslated regions (blue) regulate translation into the final protein products.

In RNA, regulation may occur at the level of protein biosynthesis (translation), RNA cleavage, RNA splicing, or transcriptional termination. Regulatory sequences are frequently associated with messenger RNA (mRNA) molecules, where they are used to control mRNA biogenesis or translation. A variety of biological molecules may bind to the RNA to accomplish this regulation, including proteins (e.g., translational repressors and splicing factors), other RNA molecules (e.g., miRNA) and small molecules, in the case of riboswitches.

== Activation and implementation ==
A regulatory DNA sequence does not regulate unless it is activated. Different regulatory sequences are activated and then implement their regulation by different mechanisms.

=== Enhancer activation and implementation ===
Expression of genes in mammals can be upregulated when signals are transmitted to the promoters associated with the genes. Cis-regulatory DNA sequences that are located in DNA regions distant from the promoters of genes can have very large effects on gene expression, with some genes undergoing up to 100-fold increased expression due to such a cis-regulatory sequence. These cis-regulatory sequences include enhancers, silencers, insulators and tethering elements. Among this constellation of sequences, enhancers and their associated transcription factor proteins have a leading role in the regulation of gene expression.

Enhancers are sequences of the genome that are major gene-regulatory elements. Enhancers control cell-type-specific gene expression programs, most often by looping through long distances to come in physical proximity with the promoters of their target genes. In a study of brain cortical neurons, 24,937 loops were found, bringing enhancers to promoters. Multiple enhancers, each often at tens or hundreds of thousands of nucleotides distant from their target genes, loop to their target gene promoters and coordinate with each other to control expression of their common target gene.

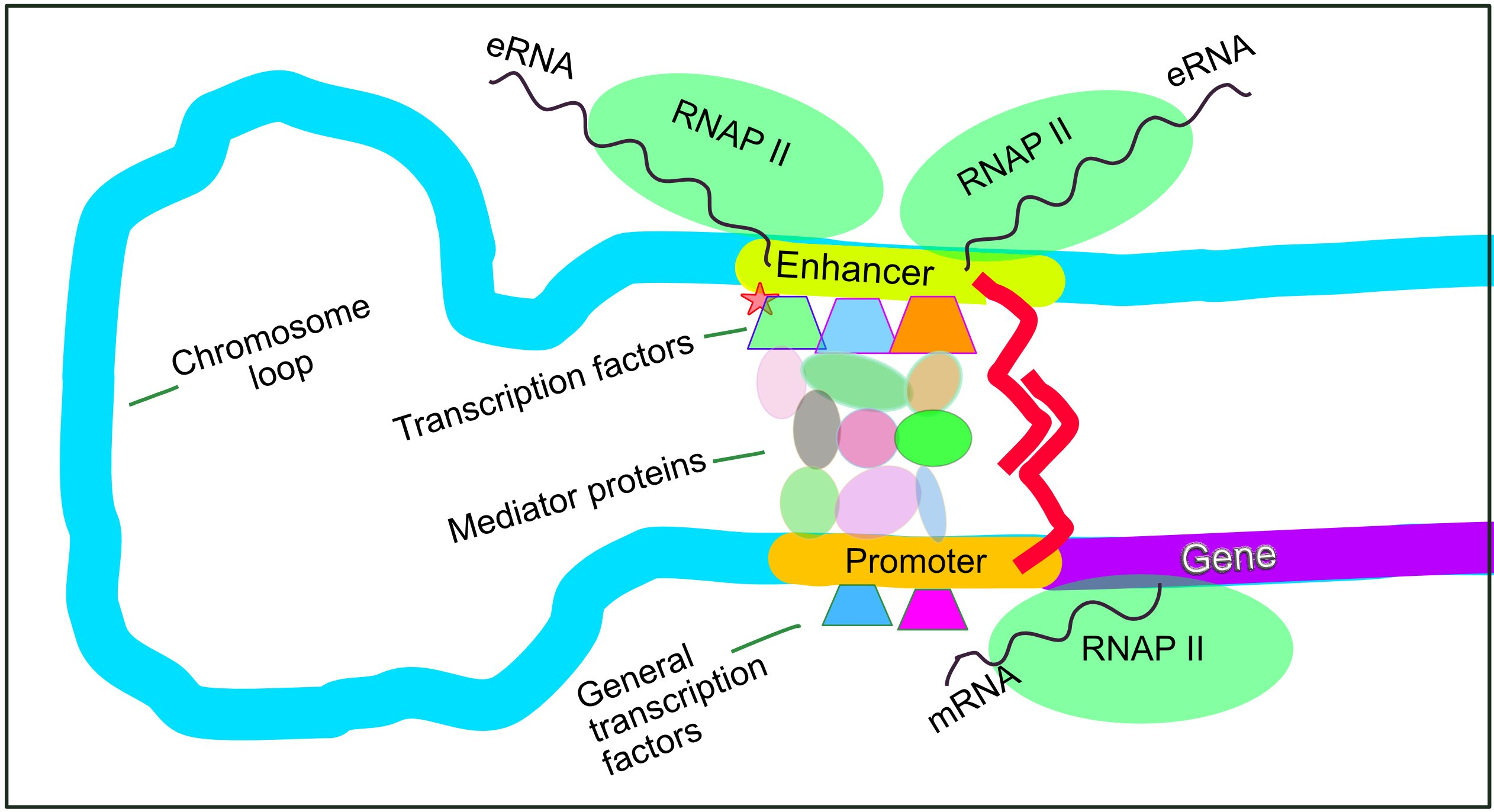
Regulation of transcription in mammals. An active enhancer regulatory sequence of DNA is enabled to interact with the promoter DNA regulatory sequence of its target gene by formation of a chromosome loop

The schematic illustration in this section shows an enhancer looping around to come into close physical proximity with the promoter of a target gene. The loop is stabilized by a dimer of a connector protein (e.g. dimer of CTCF or YY1), with one member of the dimer anchored to its binding motif on the enhancer and the other member anchored to its binding motif on the promoter (represented by the red zigzags in the illustration). Several cell function specific transcription factor proteins (in 2018 Lambert et al. indicated there were about 1,600 transcription factors in a human cell) generally bind to specific motifs on an enhancer and a small combination of these enhancer-bound transcription factors, when brought close to a promoter by a DNA loop, govern the level of transcription of the target gene. Mediator (coactivator) (a complex usually consisting of about 26 proteins in an interacting structure) communicates regulatory signals from enhancer DNA-bound transcription factors directly to the RNA polymerase II (RNAP II) enzyme bound to the promoter.

Enhancers, when active, are generally transcribed from both strands of DNA with RNA polymerases acting in two different directions, producing two eRNAs as illustrated in the Figure. An inactive enhancer may be bound by an inactive transcription factor. Phosphorylation of the transcription factor may activate it and that activated transcription factor may then activate the enhancer to which it is bound (see small red star representing phosphorylation of a transcription factor bound to an enhancer in the illustration). An activated enhancer begins transcription of its RNA before activating a promoter to initiate transcription of messenger RNA from its target gene.

Transcription factor binding sites within enhancers (see figure above) are usually about 10 base pairs long, though they can vary from just a few to about 20 base pairs. Enhancers usually have about 10 transcription factor binding sites within an average enhancer site of about 204 base pairs. Examining enhancer-gene regulatory interactions occurring in 352 cell types and tissues, more than 13 million active enhancers were found.

==== Super-enhancer ====
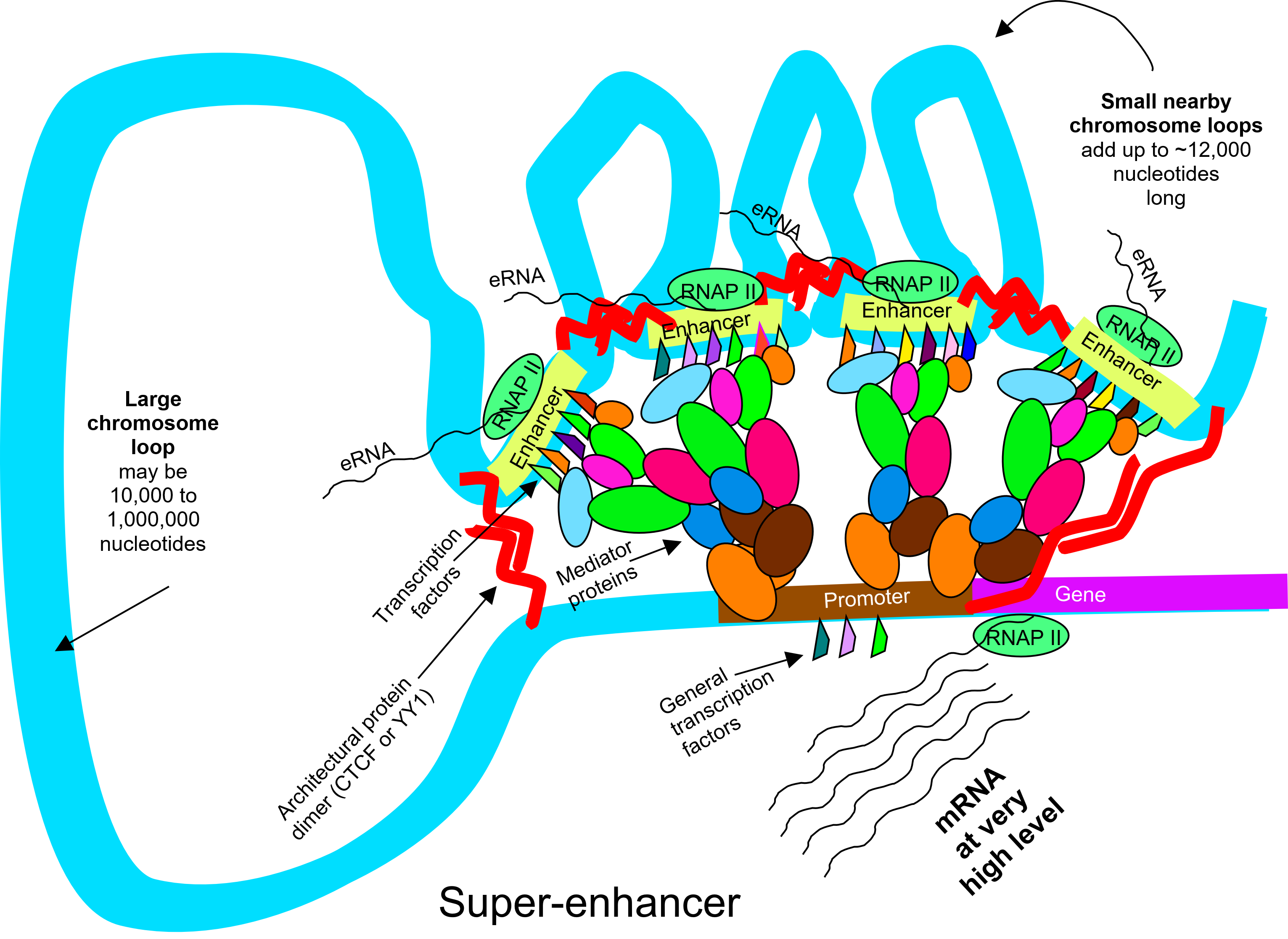
A super-enhancer is a cluster of typical enhancers that drives a high level of transcription of a target gene

While enhancers are needed for transcription of genes in a cell above low levels, a cluster of enhancers, known as a super-enhancer, can cause transcription of a target gene at even higher levels. Super-enhancers usually drive genes needed for cell identity to express at high levels. In cancers, a super-enhancer may also drive a particular oncogene to express at a high level.

A super-enhancer is defined as a cluster of typical enhancers in close genomic proximity (within about 9,000 to 22,0000 base pairs in length) that, all together, regulate the expression of a target gene. Super-enhancer-driven genes are expressed at significantly higher levels than the expression of genes under the control of typical enhancers.

A diagram of a super-enhancer is shown in the Figure in this section. In this Figure, the super-enhancer is 12,000 nucleotides long and has four typical enhancers within its length. Each of the typical enhancers simultaneously contacts the promoter region of the same target gene. Each typical enhancer within the super-enhancer has multiple DNA motifs to which transcription factors bind. Each typical enhancer is also bound to a 26-component mediator complex which transmits the signals from the transcription factors bound to the enhancer to the promoter of their joint target gene. The protein BRD4 forms a complex with each typical enhancer in the super-enhancer and helps to stabilizes the super-enhancer structure. In addition, the architectural protein YY1 (indicated by paired red zigzags) helps keep the loops together that bring the typical enhancers to their target gene in the super-enhancer. Therefore, there are many proteins in close association at a super-enhancer. These proteins generally have a structured domain as well as a tail with an intrinsically disordered region (IDR). Many of the IDRs of these proteins interact with each other, thereby forming a water-excluding gel or phase-separated condensate around the super-enhancer.

Some super-enhancers induce very high levels of transcription such as the mouse α-globin super-enhancer and the Wap super-enhancer. The mouse α-globin super-enhancer has five typical enhancers within the super-enhancer. Only when acting together, they increase transcription of the α-globin gene by 450-fold. In another example, the mouse Wap super-enhancer includes three typical enhancers. Only when the three typical enhancers act together do they increase transcription of the Wap gene by 1000-fold.

The enhancers within the super-enhancers described above act synergistically. However, in a second type of super-enhancer, the component enhancers act additively. In a third group, super-enhancers appear to act "logistically" where promoter activity reaches a limit. One study examined 773 target genes that were paired with near-by groups of possible super-enhancers (with 2–20 enhancers in close proximity likely acting as super-enhancers). In this study it appeared that 277, 92, and 250 of the likely super-enhancers acted by the additive, synergistic, and logistic models.

Super-enhancers may occupy regions of the genome about 10,000 to 60,000 nucleotides long. while typical enhancers are each about 204 base pairs long. When 8 types of cells were evaluated, super-enhancers constituted between 2.5% to 10.9% of the enhancers driving transcription while typical enhancers were the majority of enhancers driving transcription. There were between 257 and 1,099 super-enhancers in these eight cell types and between 5,512 and 23,869 typical enhancers.

While super-enhancers are only active at about 2.5% – 10.9% of actively transcribed sites in a cell, they recruit transcription machinery more actively than at typical single enhancers. The super-enhancers in a cell utilize about 12% to 36% of the RNA polymerases, mediator proteins, BRD4 proteins, and other transcription machinery of the cell.

=== CpG island methylation and demethylation ===
A methyl group is added on the carbon at the number 5 position of the ring to form 5-methylcytosine

5-Methylcytosine (5-mC) is a methylated form of the DNA base cytosine (see figure). 5-mC is an epigenetic marker found predominantly on cytosines within CpG dinucleotides, which consist of a cytosine is followed by a guanine reading in the 5' to 3' direction along the DNA strand (CpG sites). About 28 million CpG dinucleotides occur in the human genome. In most tissues of mammals, on average, 70% to 80% of CpG cytosines are methylated (forming 5-methyl-CpG, or 5-mCpG). Methylated cytosines within CpG sequences often occur in groups, called CpG islands. About 59% of promoter sequences have a CpG island while only about 6% of enhancer sequences have a CpG island. CpG islands constitute regulatory sequences, since if CpG islands are methylated in the promoter of a gene this can reduce or silence gene expression.

DNA methylation regulates gene expression through interaction with methyl binding domain (MBD) proteins, such as MeCP2, MBD1 and MBD2. These MBD proteins bind most strongly to highly methylated CpG islands. These MBD proteins have both a methyl-CpG-binding domain and a transcriptional repression domain. They bind to methylated DNA and guide or direct protein complexes with chromatin remodeling and/or histone modifying activity to methylated CpG islands. MBD proteins generally repress local chromatin by means such as catalyzing the introduction of repressive histone marks or creating an overall repressive chromatin environment through nucleosome remodeling and chromatin reorganization.

Transcription factors are proteins that bind to specific DNA sequences in order to regulate the expression of a given gene. The binding sequence for a transcription factor in DNA is usually about 10 or 11 nucleotides long. There are approximately 1,400 different transcription factors encoded in the human genome, and they constitute about 6% of all human protein coding genes. About 94% of transcription factor binding sites that are associated with signal-responsive genes occur in enhancers while only about 6% of such sites occur in promoters.

EGR1 is a transcription factor important for regulation of methylation of CpG islands. An EGR1 transcription factor binding site is frequently located in enhancer or promoter sequences. There are about 12,000 binding sites for EGR1 in the mammalian genome and about half of EGR1 binding sites are located in promoters and half in enhancers. The binding of EGR1 to its target DNA binding site is insensitive to cytosine methylation in the DNA.

While only small amounts of EGR1 protein are detectable in cells that are un-stimulated, EGR1 translation into protein at one hour after stimulation is markedly elevated. Expression of EGR1 in various types of cells can be stimulated by growth factors, neurotransmitters, hormones, stress and injury. In the brain, when neurons are activated, EGR1 proteins are upregulated, and they bind to (recruit) pre-existing TET1 enzymes, which are highly expressed in neurons. TET enzymes can catalyze demethylation of 5-methylcytosine. When EGR1 transcription factors bring TET1 enzymes to EGR1 binding sites in promoters, the TET enzymes can demethylate the methylated CpG islands at those promoters. Upon demethylation, these promoters can then initiate transcription of their target genes. Hundreds of genes in neurons are differentially expressed after neuron activation through EGR1 recruitment of TET1 to methylated regulatory sequences in their promoters.

=== Activation by double- or single-strand breaks ===
About 600 regulatory sequences in promoters and about 800 regulatory sequences in enhancers appear to depend on double-strand breaks initiated by topoisomerase 2β (TOP2B) for activation. The induction of particular double-strand breaks is specific with respect to the inducing signal. When neurons are activated in vitro, just 22 TOP2B-induced double-strand breaks occur in their genomes. However, when contextual fear conditioning is carried out in a mouse, this conditioning causes hundreds of gene-associated DSBs in the medial prefrontal cortex and hippocampus, which are important for learning and memory.

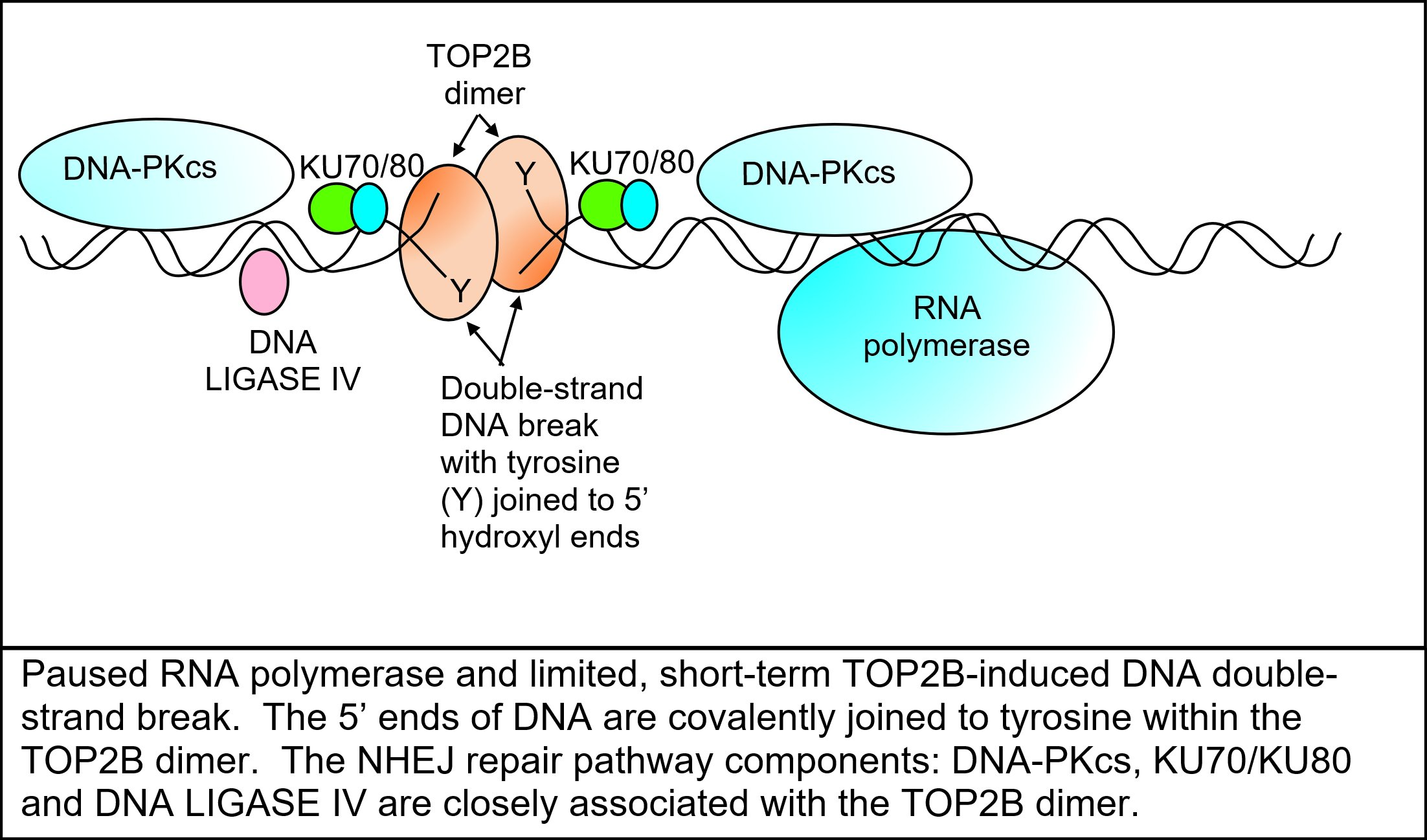
Regulatory sequence in a promoter at a transcription start site with a paused RNA polymerase and a TOP2B-induced double-strand break

Such TOP2B-induced double-strand breaks are accompanied by at least four enzymes of the non-homologous end joining (NHEJ) DNA repair pathway (DNA-PKcs, KU70, KU80 and DNA LIGASE IV) (see figure). These enzymes repair the double-strand breaks within about 15 minutes to 2 hours. The double-strand breaks in the promoter are thus associated with TOP2B and at least these four repair enzymes. These proteins are present simultaneously on a single promoter nucleosome (there are about 147 nucleotides in the DNA sequence wrapped around a single nucleosome) located near the transcription start site of their target gene.

The double-strand break introduced by TOP2B apparently frees the part of the promoter at an RNA polymerase–bound transcription start site to physically move to its associated enhancer. This allows the enhancer, with its bound transcription factors and mediator proteins, to directly interact with the RNA polymerase that had been paused at the transcription start site to start transcription.

Similarly, topoisomerase I (TOP1) enzymes appear to be located at many enhancers, and those enhancers become activated when TOP1 introduces a single-strand break. TOP1 causes single-strand breaks in particular enhancer DNA regulatory sequences when signaled by a specific enhancer-binding transcription factor. Topoisomerase I breaks are associated with different DNA repair factors than those surrounding TOP2B breaks. In the case of TOP1, the breaks are associated most immediately with DNA repair enzymes MRE11, RAD50 and ATR.

== Examples ==
Genomes can be analyzed systematically to identify regulatory regions. Conserved non-coding sequences often contain regulatory regions, and so they are often the subject of these analyses.

- CAAT box
- CCAAT box
- Operator (biology)
- Pribnow box
- TATA box
- SECIS element, mRNA
- Polyadenylation signal, mRNA
- A-box
- Z-box
- C-box
- E-box
- G-box

=== Insulin gene ===
Regulatory sequences for the insulin gene are:

- A5
- Z
- negative regulatory element (NRE)
- C2
- E2
- A3
- cAMP response element
- A2
- CAAT enhancer binding (CEB)
- C1
- E1
- G1

== See also ==
- Regulator gene
- Regulation of gene expression
- Cis-acting element
- Gene regulatory network
- Open Regulatory Annotation Database
- Operon
- DNA binding site
- Promoter
- Trans-acting factor
- ORegAnno
