= Insulin regulatory sequence =

Transcription of insulin is regulated by the binding of various transcription factors to the ~400 base pairs before the insulin transcription start site, called the "insulin regulatory sequence". This sequence is made up of several distinct regions with different biochemical properties, each of which serve as binding sites for distinct regulatory proteins. First, multiple A/T-rich sequences, called "A elements", each of which contains a "TAAT" reocognized by homeodomain proteins. These regions are primarily bound by PDX-1, but also Cdx2 and Isl-1. Second, two so-called "C elements" – C1 located 107–118 base pairs before the transcription start site; C2 311–317 base pairs before the start site. C1 is bound by RIPE3b1 via MafA. C2 (also called the "pancreatic islet cell enhancer sequence" or "PISCES") is bound by PAX6. Third, an "E element" (two in rodents) with sequence GCCATCTG is 91–100 base pairs before the transcription start site and binds the helix-loop-helix transcription factors NEUROD1. Lastly, several "cyclic AMP response elements" with sequence TGACGTCA that binds CREB.

In humans, a "Z-element" resides 243–292 base pairs before the start site and binds a complex called ZaI, as well as PDX-1 and MafA.

Regulatory sequences and their transcription factors for the insulin gene.
| Regulatory sequence | binding transcription factors |
|---|---|
| ILPR | Par1 |
| A5 | Pdx1 |
| negative regulatory element (NRE) | glucocorticoid receptor, Oct1 |
| Z (overlapping NRE and C2) | ISF |
| C2 | Pax4, MafA(?) |
| E2 | USF1/USF2 |
| A3 | Pdx1 |
| CREB RE | CREB, CREM |
| A2 | – |
| CAAT enhancer binding (CEB) (partly overlapping A2 and C1) | – |
| C1 | – |
| E1 | E2A, NeuroD1, HEB |
| A1 | Pdx1 |
| G1 | – |
