= Nested gene =

A nested gene is a gene whose entire coding sequence lies within the bounds (between the start codon and the stop codon) of a larger external gene. The coding sequence for a nested gene differs greatly from the coding sequence for its external host gene. Typically, nested genes and their host genes encode functionally unrelated proteins, and have different expression patterns in an organism.

There are two categories of nested genes:

- genes nested within an intron of a larger gene
- genes which lie opposite the coding sequence of a larger gene

== Nested intronic genes ==
A nested intronic gene lies within the non-coding intronic region of a larger gene, and occurs relatively frequently, especially in the introns of metazoans and higher eukaryotes. Because only eukaryotic DNA contains intronic regions, this type of gene does not occur in bacteria or archaea.

The human genome contains a relatively high proportion of nested intronic genes. It is predicted to contain at least 158 functional intronic nested genes, with an additional 212 pseudogenes and three snoRNA genes nested in intronic regions. These genes seem to be distributed randomly across all chromosomes, and the majority code for proteins that are functionally unrelated to their host genes.

== Genes nested opposite coding sequences ==
Genes nested opposite the coding sequences of their host genes are very rare, and have been observed in prokaryotes, and more recently, in yeast (S. cerevisiae) and in Tetrahymena thermophila. These non-intronic nested genes remain to be identified in metazoan genomes. As with intronic nested genes, nonintronic nested genes typically do not share functions or expression patterns with their host genes.

== See also ==
- Overlapping gene
- Genetic code
- RNA splicing
- Alternative splicing
