= Mature messenger RNA =

Eukaryotic RNA transcript

Mature messenger RNA, often abbreviated as mature mRNA is a eukaryotic RNA transcript that has been spliced and processed and is ready for translation in the course of protein synthesis. Unlike the eukaryotic RNA immediately after transcription known as precursor messenger RNA, Mature mRNA consists exclusively of exons and has had all introns removed.

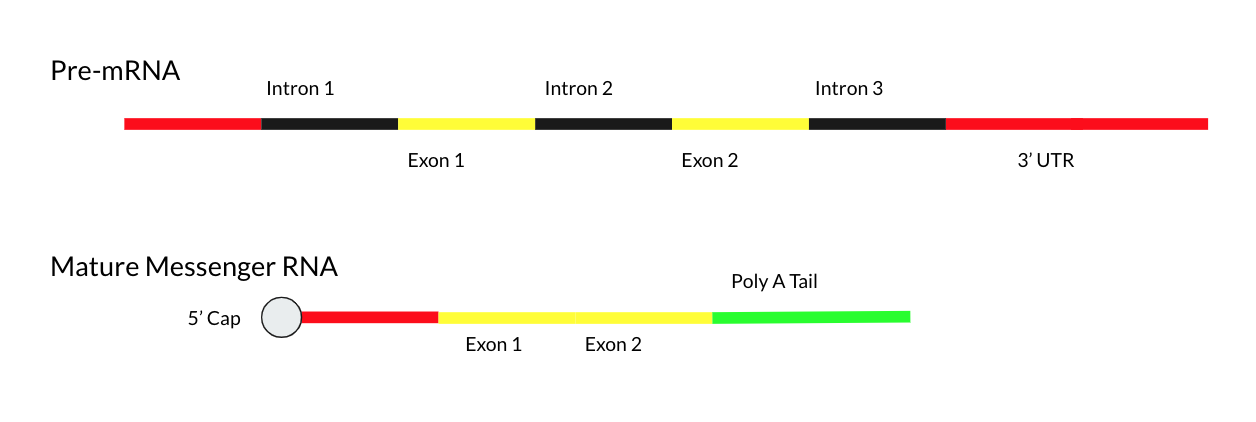
The Maturation of mRNA

Mature mRNA is also called "mature transcript", or in narrow contexts "mature RNA"; in broader contexts mature mRNA is often called simply messenger RNA (or mRNA).

The production of a mature mRNA molecule occurs in 3 steps:

1. Capping of the 5' end
2. Polyadenylation of the 3' end
3. RNA Splicing of the introns

== Capping the 5' End ==
During capping, a 7-methylguanosine residue is attached to the 5'-terminal end of the primary transcripts. This is otherwise known as the GTP or 5' cap. The 5' cap is used to increase mRNA stability. Further, the 5' cap is used as an attachment point for ribosomes. Beyond this, the 5' cap has also been shown to have a role in exporting the mature mRNA from the nucleus and into the cytoplasm.

== Polyadenylation ==
In polyadenylation, a poly-adenosine tail of about 200 adenylate residues is added by a nuclear polymerase post-transcriptionally. This is known as a Poly-A tail and is used for stability and guidance, so that the mRNA can exit the nucleus and find the ribosome. It is added at a polyadenylation site in the 3' untranslated region of the mRNA, cleaving the mRNA in the process. When there are multiple polyadenylation sites on the same mRNA molecule, alternative polyadenylation can occur. See polyadenylation for further details.

== RNA Splicing ==
Pre-mRNA has both introns and exons. As a part of the maturation process, RNA splicing removes the non-coding RNA introns leaving behind the exons, which are then spliced and joined to form the mature mRNA. Splicing is conducted by the spliceosome. The spliceosome is a large ribonucleoprotein which cleaves the RNA at the splicing site and recombines the exons of the RNA. Similar to polyadenylation, alternative splicing can occur, resulting in several possible proteins being translated from the same portion of DNA. See RNA Splicing for further details.
