= Timeline of scientific experiments =

The timeline below shows the date of publication of major scientific experiments:

== 5th century BC ==
- 430 BC - Empedocles proves that air is a material substance by submerging a clepsydra into the ocean.

== 2nd century BC ==
- 240 BC - Archimedes devised a principle which he later used to solve the riddle of the suspect crown.
- 230 BC – Eratosthenes measures the Earth's circumference and diameter.

== 10th century ==
- Abu Bakr al-Razi (Rhazes) introduces controlled experiment into the field of medicine and carried out the first medical experiment in order to find the most hygienic place to build a hospital.

== 11th century ==
- 1020 – Avicenna (Ibn Sina) introduces experimentation and quantification into the study of medicine and physiology, including the introduction of experimental medicine and clinical trials, in The Canon of Medicine.
- 1021 – Ibn al-Haytham (Alhacen) pioneers the experimental scientific method and experimental physics in his Book of Optics, where he devises the first scientific experiments on optics, including the first use of the camera obscura to prove that light travels in straight lines and the first experimental proof that visual perception is caused by light rays travelling to the eyes, which also marks the beginning of experimental psychology and psychophysics.
- 1030 – Al-Biruni conducts the first elaborate experiments related to astronomical phenomena and introduces the experimental method into mechanics.

== 12th century ==
- 1121 – Al-Khazini makes extensive use of the experimental method to prove his theories on mechanics in The Book of the Balance of Wisdom.
- Ibn Zuhr (Avenzoar) is the first physician to carry out human postmortem dissections and autopsies. He proves that the skin disease scabies is caused by a parasite, a discovery which upsets the Hippocratic and Galenic theory of humorism.

== 13th century ==
- 1200 – Abd al-Latif al-Baghdadi observes and examines a large number of skeletons, and he discovered that Galen was incorrect regarding the formation of the bones of the lower jaw and sacrum.
- 1242 – Ibn al-Nafis carries out autopsies which leads him to the discovery of pulmonary circulation and the circulatory system.
- Kamāl al-Dīn al-Fārisī provides the first correct explanation of the rainbow phenomenon and uses the experimental method to prove his theory.
- Albertus Magnus documents that nitric acid can dissolve silver and the resulting silver nitrate solution will blacken skin.

== 16th century ==
- 1572 – Tycho Brahe observes the 1572 supernova, evidence against the Aristotelian notion of an immutable heavenly sphere.

== 17th century ==
- 1609 – Galileo Galilei observes moons of Jupiter in support of the heliocentric model.
- 1638 – Galileo Galilei uses rolling balls to disprove the Aristotelian theory of motion.
- 1665 – Robert Hooke, using a microscope, observes cells.
- 1672 – Isaac Newton publishes the results of his Prism experiments, demonstrating the existence in white light of a mixture of distinct coloured rays.
- 1676 – Ole Rømer measures the speed of light for the first time.
- 1687 – Isaac Newton publishes the thought experiment Newton's cannonball, hypothesizes that the force of gravity is universal and is the key force for planetary motion.

== 18th century ==
- 1747 – James Lind: Conducts one of the earliest European clinical trials, showing that scurvy was cured by consuming fresh oranges and lemons, but not other tested acids or drinks.
- 1774 – Charles Mason: Conducts an experiment near the Scottish mountain of Schiehallion that attempts to measure the mean density of the Earth for the first time. Known as the Schiehallion experiment.
- 1796 – Edward Jenner: tests the first vaccine.
- 1798 – Henry Cavendish: Torsion bar experiment to measure Newton's gravitational constant.

== 19th century ==
- 1801 – Thomas Young: double-slit experiment demonstrates the wave nature of light.
- 1820 – Hans Christian Ørsted discovers the connection between electricity and magnetism.
- 1843 – James Prescott Joule measures the equivalence between mechanical work and heat, resulting in the law of conservation of energy.
- 1845 – Christian Doppler demonstrates the Doppler shift.
- 1851 – Léon Foucault uses Foucault pendulum to demonstrate the rotation of the Earth.
- 1859 – Charles Darwin publishes The Origin of Species showing that evolution occurs by natural selection.
- 1861 – Louis Pasteur disproves the theory of spontaneous generation.
- 1863 – Gregor Mendel's pea plant experiments (Mendel's laws of inheritance).
- 1887 – Heinrich Hertz discovers the photoelectric effect.
- 1887 – Michelson and Morley: Michelson–Morley experiment, showing that the speed of light is invariant.
- 1896 – Henri Becquerel discovers radioactivity.
- 1897 – J. J. Thomson discovers the electron.

== 20th century ==
- 1909 – Robert Millikan: oil-drop experiment which suggests that electric charge occurs as quanta (the electron).
- 1911 – Ernest Rutherford's gold foil experiment determines that atoms are mostly empty space, and that the core of each atom, which he named the atomic nucleus, is dense and positively charged
- 1911 – Heike Kamerlingh Onnes: superconductivity.
- 1914 - James Franck and Gustav Ludwig Hertz conduct the Franck–Hertz experiment demonstrating quantization of atomic ionization energy.
- 1919 – Arthur Eddington: The Sun as gravitational lens, a proof of the theory of relativity.
- 1920 – Otto Stern and Walter Gerlach conduct the Stern–Gerlach experiment, which demonstrates particle spin.
- 1920 – John B. Watson and Rosalie Rayner conduct the Little Albert experiment.
- 1928 – Griffith's experiment shows that living cells can be transformed via a transforming principle, later discovered to be DNA.
- 1934 – Enrico Fermi splits the atom.
- 1935 – Lady tasting tea experiment by Ronald A. Fisher, foundational in statistical hypothesis testing.
- 1940 – Karl von Frisch decodes the "dance" honeybees use to communicate the location of flowers.
- 1944 – Barbara McClintock breeds maize plants for color, which leads to the discovery of jumping genes.
- 1947 – John Bardeen and Walter Brattain fabricate the first working transistor.
- 1951 – Solomon Asch shows how group pressure can persuade an individual to conform to an obviously wrong opinion.
- 1952 – Alfred Hershey & Martha Chase: Hershey–Chase experiment proves that DNA is the hereditary material .
- 1953 – Stanley L. Miller & Harold C. Urey: Miller–Urey experiment demonstrates that organic compounds can arise spontaneously from inorganic ones.
- 1955 – Clyde L. Cowan and Frederick Reines confirm the existence of the neutrino in the neutrino experiment.
- 1958 – Meselson–Stahl experiment proves that DNA replication is semiconservative.
- 1960 – B. F. Skinner's demonstrations of operant conditioning.
- 1961 – Francis Crick, Sydney Brenner, Leslie Barnett and R.J. Watts-Tobin prove the triplet nature of the genetic code.
- 1961 – Marshall W. Nirenberg and J. Heinrich Matthaei deciphered the first codon of the genetic code.
- 1964 – Marshall W. Nirenberg and Philip Leder deciphered the rest of the genetic code.
- 1965 – Arno Penzias and Robert Wilson find cosmic microwave background radiation, evidence of the Big Bang.
- 1967 – Kerim Kerimov launches the Cosmos 186 and Cosmos 188 as experiments on automatic docking eventually leading to the development of space stations.
- 1970 – Allan and Beatrix Gardner teach American Sign Language to the chimpanzee Washoe.
- 1974 – Stanley Milgram conducts the Milgram experiment on obedience to authority.
- 1995 – Eric A. Cornell and Carl E. Wieman synthesize Bose–Einstein condensate.

== See also ==
- List of timelines of science and technology
- List of experiments
- Timeline of the history of the scientific method
- Timeline of scientific discoveries
- Timeline of historic inventions
