= Homersham =

Surname list

Homersham is the surname and first name of the following people

== Surname ==
- S. C. Homersham (c. 1816-1886), English hydraulic engineer
- Miriam Homersham (1892– 1936), early woman English accountant, co-founder of Women's Pioneer Housing

== First name ==
- Homersham Cox (lawyer) (1821-1897), English lawyer and mathematician
- Homersham Cox (mathematician) (1857-1918), English mathematician
