= Cell-free protein synthesis =

Production of protein in a cell-free system

Cell-free protein synthesis (CFPS), also known as in vitro protein synthesis or in vitro transcription/translation (IVTT), is the production of protein using biological machinery in a cell-free system, that is, without the use of living cells. The in vitro protein synthesis environment is not constrained by a cell wall or homeostasis conditions necessary to maintain cell viability. Thus, CFPS enables direct access and control of the translation environment which is advantageous for a number of applications including co-translational solubilisation of membrane proteins, optimisation of protein production, incorporation of non-natural amino acids, selective and site-specific labelling. Due to the open nature of the system, different expression conditions such as pH, redox potentials, temperatures, and chaperones can be screened. Since there is no need to maintain cell viability, toxic proteins can be produced.

== Introduction ==
Common components of a cell-free reaction include a cell extract, an energy source, a supply of amino acids, cofactors such as magnesium, and the DNA with the desired genes. A cell extract is obtained by lysing the cell of interest and centrifuging out the cell walls, DNA genome, and other debris. The remains are the necessary cell machinery including ribosomes, aminoacyl-tRNA synthetases, translation initiation and elongation factors, nucleases, etc.

Two types of DNA can be used in CFPS: plasmids and linear expression templates (LETs). Plasmids are circular, and only made inside cells. LETs can be made much more effectively via PCR, which replicates DNA much faster than raising cells in an incubator. While LETs are easier and faster to make, plasmid yields are usually much higher in CFPS. Because of this, much research today is focused on optimizing CFPS LET yields to approach the yields of CFPS with plasmids.

An energy source is an important part of a cell-free reaction. Usually, a separate mixture containing the needed energy source, along with a supply of amino acids, is added to the extract for the reaction. Common sources are phosphoenol pyruvate, acetyl phosphate, and creatine phosphate.

== Advantages and applications ==
CFPS has many advantages over the traditional in vivo synthesis of proteins. Most notably, a cell-free reaction, including extract preparation, usually takes 1 –2 days, whereas in vivo protein expression may take 1–2 weeks.

CFPS is an open reaction. The lack of cell wall allows direct manipulation of the chemical environment. Samples are easily taken, concentrations optimized, and the reaction can be monitored. In contrast, once DNA is inserted into live cells, the reaction cannot be accessed until it is over and the cells are lysed.

Another advantage to CFPS is the lack of concern for toxicity. Some desired proteins and labeled proteins are toxic to cells when synthesized. Since live cells are not being used, the toxicity of the product protein is not a significant concern.

These advantages enable numerous applications. A major application of CFPS is incorporation of unnatural amino acids into protein structures (see expanded genetic code). The openness of the reaction is ideal for inserting the modified tRNAs and unnatural amino acids required for such a reaction.

Synthetic biology has many other uses and is a bright future in fields such as protein evolution, nanomachines, nucleic acid circuits, and synthesis of virus-like particles for vaccines and drug therapy.

== Limitations ==
One challenge associated with CFPS is the degradation of the DNA by endogenous nucleases in the cell extract. This is particularly problematic with LETs. Cells have endonucleases that attack random sites of a DNA strands; however, much more common are the exonucleases which attack DNA from the ends. Since plasmids are circular and have no end to which the exonucleases may attach, they are not affected by the latter. LETs, however, are susceptible to both. Because of LET vulnerability, much research today is focused on optimizing CFPS LET yields to approach the yields of CFPS using plasmids.

One example of this improved protection with plasmids is use of the bacteriophage lambda gam protein. Gam is an inhibitor of RecBCD, an exonuclease found in Escherichia coli (E. coli). With the use of gam, CFPS yields with LETs were greatly increased, and were comparable to CFPS yields with plasmids. PURE extracts can also be made, eliminating the concern of exonucleases. These extracts are expensive to make and are not currently an economical solution to the issue of exogenous DNA degradation.

== Types of cell-free systems ==
Common cell extracts in use today are made from E. coli (ECE), rabbit reticulocytes (RRL), wheat germ (WGE), insect cells (ICE) and Yeast Kluyveromyces (the D2P system). All of these extracts are commercially available.

ECE is the most popular lysate for several reasons. It is the most inexpensive extract and the least time intensive to create. Also, large amounts of E. coli are easily grown, and then easily lysed through use of a homogenizer or a sonicator. ECE also provides the highest protein yields. However, high yield production can limit the complexity of the synthesized protein, particularly in post-translational modification. In that regard, the lower efficient eukaryotic systems could be advantageous, provided that modifying enzyme systems have been maintained in the extracts.

Each eukaryotic system has their advantages and disadvantages. For example, WGE extract produces the highest yields of the three eukaryotic extracts; however, it is not as effective for some post-translational modifications such as glycosylation. When choosing an extract, the type of post-translational modification, desired yields, and cost should be taken into account.

== History ==
Cell-free protein synthesis has been used for over 60 years, and notably, the first elucidation of a codon was done by Marshall Nirenberg and Heinrich J. Matthaei in 1961 at the National Institutes of Health. They used a cell-free system to translate a poly-uracil RNA sequence (or UUUUU... in biochemical terms) and discovered that the polypeptide they had synthesized consisted of only the amino acid phenylalanine. They thereby deduced from this poly-phenylalanine that the codon UUU specified the amino-acid phenylalanine. Extending this work, Nirenberg and his coworkers were able to determine the nucleotide makeup of each codon.

== See also ==
- Nirenberg and Matthaei experiment
- Polymerase chain reaction optimization
