= Etheldred Browning =

Angle-Irish suffragette, founder of Women's Pioneer Housing

- Born: Edith Anna Browning; 17 September 1869
- Died: April 30, 1946 (aged 76)
- Occupations: Suffragette, Campaigner for women's housing
- Known for: Founder of Women's Pioneer Housing

Etheldred Browning (17 September 1869 - 30 April 1946) was an Anglo-Irish suffragette and founder of the Women's Pioneer Housing organisation.

== Early life and education ==
Edith Anna Browning was born on 17 September 1869 in Donnybrook, Dublin to Julia Mary (nee Smart) (1841-1925) and Jeffrey Francis Browning (1832-1889). She was the third of four siblings, the only girl. Her mother was born in London, and her maternal grandfather, Henry Thomas Smart, was a professor of music. Her father was Solicitor to the Court of the Irish Land Commission. Her paternal family were of an aristocratic Anglo-Irish background and featured in Burke’s Irish Peerage. Their roots lay in seventeeth century Gloucestershire, then County Waterford until settling in County Limerick. Maud Joachim was a cousin.

In 1886, she attended Metropolitan School of Art in Dublin and began using the name Etheldred instead of Edith Anna.

== Suffrage activity ==
By the 1900s,Browing was heavily involved in Dublin's suffrage movement, giving talks and writing articles on a broad swathe of social issues of concern to women. She made a presentation at the opening ceremony of the Library of the Irish Women’s Reform League. By August 1913, she was exhorting "women factory inspectors — women law makers, women police, women on the jury, women lawyers, women everywhere that is the need of our country… rise! You must free all others to be free!" in the Irish Citizen, the newspaper of the Irish Women’s Franchise League.

At a Dublin meeting of a number of Suffrage Societies in November 1913, she "disagreed with the suggestion that they were working to relieve the sufferings of the poor, and said that each of them was working selfishly for her own good to bring out the “real woman”, which was the greatest blessing that could be conferred on humanity". In December 1913, the Irish Independent newspaper pictured Browning as one of the "Ladies Prominently Identified with Suffrage Week in Ireland".

During World War I, Browning researched women’s wages for the Irish Central Committee for the Employment of Women. As part of the Suffrage Emergency Council’s work, she and Florence Lily Carre ran the Dublin Embroidery Industry.

In April 1916, Browning's elder brother, barrister and sportsman Frank Henry Browning was killed in the Easter Rising.

Shortly after the war, Browning moved to London, where she continued her activism on behalf of women. This included writing numerous articles which focussed on the issues of housing. In ‘A Practical Programme for the Practical Working of a Housing Committee’, ‘State Aided Houses in the Flesh’ and ‘Women and Town Planning’ she outined a variety of options in which women’s organisations could play a part in a much needed national housing initiative.

In 1919, Browning was invited to join the Garden Cities and Town Planning Association's Women’s Section. In February 1920, she was a speaker at the GCTPA women’s conference, part of the Daily Mail Ideal Home Exhibition. Browning met many well connected and influential women interested in improving housing design and provision, and made the best of the networking opportunities. Under Browning's leadership the committee issued a number of reports, and in 1920 was consulted on public housing built by the Ministry of Health. Her response was critical, accompanied by a strong recommendation that plans for houses should be submitted to a committee of women for critical oversight before being approved.

== Women's Pioneer Housing ==
Browning founded the Women's Pioneer Housing organisation in October 1920. The intention was to provide housing for working single women, who struggled to find decent accommodation. The WPH mission statement was ‘to cater for the housing requirements of professional and other women of moderate means who require individual homes at moderate rents’. Browning used the contacts she had developed at the GCTPA and from her suffrage campaigns to pull together a group of influential founding members and supporters. These included Helen Archdale, Vera Brittain, Lady Emmott, Winifred Holtby, Geraldine Lennox, Ray Strachey, Sydney Bushell, Richard Reiss, Lady Rhondda and Eleanor Shelley-Rolls.

After six months, the Women’s Pioneer Housing was in a position to buy its first house. In March 1921, Browning wrote "The word “home” generally conveys the idea of a husband as being attached, but because a woman supports herself and stands more or less alone, is this any reason that she must spend her days in a hostel or a bed-sitting room, and never arrive at the dignity of a home?" in an article entiled ‘Women and Homes’ in The Vote suffragist newspaper.

Funding was an initial struggle as Browning's hopes to use government funds from the post war Homes Fit for Heroes programme failed. An early financial crisis in 1921 led to Browning's plans for the Women’s Pioneer Housing to be mainly run by women being challenged. She had to accept that Committee of Management roles involving raising capital required the support of men with suitable experience in the field. Eleanor Shelley-Rolls, an investor and later President of WPH, recalled Browning's ongoing opposition to the involvement of men in the management of the organisation.

From 1923, architect Gertrude Levercus was employed by Browning to convert large houses in respectable areas of London into flats and bedsits and was appointed as WPH’s architect in 1924. Between 1925 and 1935, the number of houses managed by the WPH's increased from 15 to 55 by 1935 with 522 flats. Levercus rented rooms in one of her own projects at 65 Harrington Gardens and lived there until her retirement.

Browning was a member of the Women’s Provisional Club.

== Later life ==
Following her retirement, Browning initially lived in Eton with her cousin Dorothy Sowter, formerly her assistant at Women’s Pioneer Housing and a fellow tenant or the organisation from 1926 to 1938. In 1942, she was living at Cheltenham Terrace, and was issued a summons for causing a light after dark and was fined 20 shillings under World War II wartime restrictions. In 1945, Browning moved to Wandsworth with her niece Ruth to live in with her friends Florence Lily and Helen Carre.

Etheldred Browning died in Chelsea on 30 April 1946, aged 77.
