= List of experiments =

The following is a list of historically important scientific experiments and observations demonstrating something of great scientific interest, typically in an elegant or clever manner.

== Astronomy ==
- Galileo Galilei uses a telescope to observe that the moons of Jupiter appear to circle Jupiter. This evidence supports the heliocentric model, and weakens the geocentric model of the cosmos (1609)
- Ole Rømer makes the first quantitative estimate of the speed of light by timing the motions of Jupiter's satellite Io with a telescope (1676)
- Arno Penzias and Robert Wilson detect the cosmic microwave background radiation, giving support to the theory of the Big Bang (1964)
- The Supernova Cosmology Project and the High-Z Supernova Search Team discover, by observing Type Ia supernovae, that the expansion of the Universe is accelerating (1998)

== Biology ==
- Robert Hooke, using a microscope, observes cells (1665).
- Anton van Leeuwenhoek discovers microorganisms (1674–1676).
- James Lind, publishes 'A Treatise of the Scurvy' which describes a controlled shipboard experiment using two identical populations but with only one variable, the consumption of citrus fruit (1753).
- Edward Jenner tests his hypothesis for the protective action of mild cowpox infection for smallpox, the first vaccine (1796).
- Gregor Mendel's experiments with the garden pea led him to surmise many of the fundamental laws of genetics (dominant vs recessive genes, the 1–2–1 ratio, see Mendelian inheritance) (1856–1863).
- Charles Darwin demonstrates evolution by natural selection using many examples (1859).
- Louis Pasteur uses S-shaped flasks to prevent spores from contaminating broth. This disproves the theory of Spontaneous generation (1861) extending the rancid meat experiment of Francesco Redi (1668) to the micro scale.
- Charles Darwin and his son Francis, using dark-grown oat seedlings, discover the stimulus for phototropism is detected at the tip of the shoot (the coleoptile tip), but the bending takes place in the region below the tip (1880).
- Emil von Behring and Kitasato Shibasaburō demonstrate passive immunity, protection of animals from infection by injection of immune serum (1890).
- Thomas Hunt Morgan identifies a sex chromosome linked gene in Drosophila melanogaster (1910) and his student Alfred Sturtevant develops the first genetic map (1913).
- Alexander Fleming demonstrates that the zone of inhibition around a growth of penicillin mould on a culture dish of bacteria is caused by a diffusible substance secreted by the mould (1928).
- Frederick Griffith demonstrates (Griffith's experiment) that living cells can be transformed via a transforming principle, later discovered to be DNA (1928).
- Karl von Frisch decodes the waggle dance honey bees use to communicate the location of flowers (1940).
- George Wells Beadle and Edward Lawrie Tatum moot the "one gene-one enzyme hypothesis" based on induced mutations in bread mold Neurospora crassa (1941).
- Luria–Delbrück experiment demonstrates that in bacteria, beneficial mutations arise in the absence of selection, rather than being a response to selection (1943).
- Barbara McClintock breeds maize plants for color, which leads to the discovery of transposable elements or jumping genes (1944).
- Linus Pauling and colleagues show in "Sickle Cell Anemia, a Molecular Disease" that a human genetic disease, sickle cell anemia, is caused by a molecular change in a specific protein, hemoglobin (1949).
  Photo 51, showing the X-ray diffraction pattern of DNA
- Raymond Gosling, under the supervision of Rosalind Franklin, captures Photo 51, an X-ray diffraction photograph of a DNA fiber. The resulting diffraction pattern proved DNA's antiparallel double helical structure and became a crucial data source in the refinement of subsequent molecular models of DNA (1952).
- Hershey–Chase experiment (by Alfred Hershey and Martha Chase) uses bacteriophage to prove that DNA is the hereditary material (1952).
- Meselson–Stahl experiment proves that DNA replication is semiconservative (1958).
- The frameshift mutation experiment by Crick, Brenner and others used frameshift mutations to support the triplet nature of the genetic code (1961).
- Nirenberg and Matthaei experiment demonstrating in vitro protein synthesis using synthetic RNA as to substitute for messenger RNA (1961).
- John Gurdon clones an animal, a frog tadpole, from an egg cell using the nucleus from an intestinal cell (1962).
- Roger W. Sperry shows the potential independence of the two sides of the human brain using split-brain patients (1962–1965).
- Nirenberg and Leder experiment, binding tRNA to ribosomes with synthetic RNA to decipher the genetic code (1964).
- Demonstration of the role of reverse transcriptases in tumor viruses, independently by Howard Temin and David Baltimore, 1970.
- Herbert Boyer and Stanley Cohen selectively clone genes in bacteria, using bacterial plasmids cut by specific endonucleases (1975).
- Mary-Dell Chilton shows that crown gall tumors of plants are caused by the transfer of a small piece of DNA from the bacterium Agrobacterium tumefaciens into the host plant, where it becomes part of its genome (1977).
- Napoli, Lemieux and Jorgensen discover the principle of RNA interference (1990).
- Kazutoshi Takahashi and Shinya Yamanaka successfully reprogram mouse fibroblasts into induced pluripotent stem cells (2006).
- Hans Clevers' group create and describe the first modern organoids (2009).

== Chemistry ==
- Robert Boyle uses an air pump to determine the inverse relationship between the pressure and volume of a gas. This relationship came to be known as Boyle's law (1660–1662).
- Joseph Priestley suspends a bowl of water above a beer vat at a brewery and synthesizes carbonated water (1767).
- Antoine Lavoisier determines that oxygen combines with materials upon combustion, thus disproving phlogiston theory (1783).
- Antoine Lavoisier determines that chemical reactions in a closed container do not alter total mass. From these observations he establishes the law of conservation of mass (1789).
- Benjamin Thompson, Count Rumford demonstrates that the heat developed by the friction of boring cannon is nearly inexhaustible. This result was presented in opposition to caloric theory (1798).
- Humphry Davy uses electrolysis to isolate elemental potassium, sodium, calcium, strontium, barium, magnesium, and chlorine (1807–1810).
- Joseph Louis Gay-Lussac studies reactions among gases and determines that their volumes combine chemically in simple integer ratios (1809).
- Robert Brown studies very small particles in water under the microscope and observes Brownian motion which was later named in his honor (1827).
- Friedrich Wöhler synthesizes the organic compound urea using inorganic reactants, disproving the application of vitalism to chemical processes (1828).
- Thomas Graham measures the rates of effusion for different gases and establishes Graham's law of effusion and diffusion (1833).
- Julius Robert von Mayer and James Prescott Joule measure the heat generated by mechanical work. This establishes the principle of conservation of energy and the kinetic theory of heat (1842–1843).
- Louis Pasteur separates a racemic mixture of two enantiomers by sorting individual crystals, and demonstrates their impact on the polarization of light (1849).
- Anders Jonas Ångström observes the presence of hydrogen and other elements in the spectrum of the sun (1862).
- François-Marie Raoult demonstrates that the decrease in the vapor pressure and freezing point of liquids caused by the addition of solutes is proportional to the number of solute molecules present. This establishes the concept of colligative properties (1878).
- Svante Arrhenius studies the conductivity of salt solutions and determines that salts dissociate into ions in water (1884).
- Svante Arrhenius determines the impact of temperature on reaction rates and formulates the concept of activation energy (1889).
- William Ramsay and Lord Rayleigh (John Strutt) isolate the noble gases (1894–1898).
- Henri Becquerel, Marie Curie, and Pierre Curie discover radioactivity and describe its properties (1896).
- Mikhail Tsvet (Mikhail Semyonovich Tsvet) separates chlorophyll from other plant pigments using chromatography (1901).
- Frederick Soddy and William Ramsay observe the production of helium from alpha particles during radioactive decay (1903).
- Ernest Rutherford discovers that atoms have a very small positively charged nucleus in the gold-foil experiment, also known as the Geiger–Marsden experiment (1909).
- Otto Hahn discovers nuclear isomerism (1921).
- Albert Szent-Györgyi and Hans Adolf Krebs discover the citric acid cycle of oxidative metabolism (1935-1937).
- Otto Hahn and Fritz Strassmann discover the nuclear fission of uranium (1938).
- Glenn Theodore Seaborg and colleagues create and isolate five transuranium elements. They reorganize the periodic table to its current form. (1941–1950).
- Miller–Urey experiment demonstrates that organic compounds can arise spontaneously from inorganic ones (1953).
- Melvin Calvin and Andrew Benson delineate the path of carbon in photosynthesis using Chlorella and carbon dioxide labeled with carbon-14 (^{14}CO_{2}) (1945–1954).
- Erwin Chargaff disproves the "tetranucleoide theory" of DNA structure and determines that the composition of double-stranded DNA follows the rule, %A = %T and %G = %C (Chargaff's rule). This discovery was critical to the formulation of the Watson-Crick Model of DNA structure.
- Neil Bartlett mixes xenon and platinum hexafluoride leading to the first synthesis of a noble gas compound, xenon hexafluoroplatinate (1962).
- Robert Burns Woodward announces the total synthesis of Vitamin B-12 by a team he led (1973). Insights from this work lead him and Roald Hoffmann to formulate the Woodward–Hoffmann rules for elucidating the stereochemistry of the products of organic reactions.
- Frederick Sanger demonstrates the dideoxy- or chain termination method for determining DNA sequences (1975).
- Kary Mullis demonstrates the polymerase chain reaction, a method for amplifying specific bits of DNA (1983).
- Jennifer Doudna and Emmanuelle Charpentier demonstrate the programmability of the Cas9 endonuclease using a single-guide RNA, establishing CRISPR as a technique for targeted genome editing (2012).

== Economics and political science ==
- The experiments of Muhammad Yunus on the applications of microcredit and microfinance in rural Bangladesh (1971)
- Robert Axelrod's prisoner's dilemma computer tournaments, later documented in The Evolution of Cooperation (1984)

== Geology ==
- Georges-Louis Leclerc, Comte de Buffon using iron spheres, he attempts to calculate the age of the Earth based on its cooling.
- Charles Mason conducts an experiment near the Scottish mountain of Schiehallion that attempts to measure the mean density of the Earth for the first time. Known as the Schiehallion experiment (1774)

== Physics ==
- Inclined plane experiment (1602–07): Galileo Galilei uses rolling balls to disprove the Aristotelian theory of motion.
- Atmospheric pressure vs. altitude experiment (1648): Blaise Pascal carries a barometer up a church tower and a mountain to determine that atmospheric pressure is due to a column of air.
- Magdeburg hemispheres (1654): Otto von Guericke demonstrates atmospheric pressure using a pair of hollow copper hemisphere.
- Spring of air experiment (1660): Robert Boyle shows that the volume of a given amount of gas is inversely related to the pressure upon it.
- Kite experiment (1700s): Benjamin Franklin beginning in 1747 describes experiments in letters to Peter Collinson demonstrating electrical principles which were published in a book called Experiments and Observations on Electricity.
- Voltaic pile (1796): Alessandro Volta constructs a new source of electricity, the electrical battery.
- Cavendish experiment (1798): Henry Cavendish's torsion bar experiment measures the force of gravity in a laboratory.
- Double-slit experiment (c.1805): Thomas Young shows that light is a wave in his double-slit experiment.
- Arago spot (1819): Observation of circular diffraction by François Arago, validated a new wave theory of light by Augustin-Jean Fresnel disproving skeptics like Siméon Denis Poisson.
- Ørsted experiment (1820): Hans Christian Ørsted demonstrates the connection of electricity and magnetism by experiments involving a compass and electric circuits.
- Discovery of electromagnetic induction (1831): Michael Faraday discovers magnetic induction in an experiment with a closed ring of soft iron, with two windings of wire.
- Joule's experiment (1834):James Prescott Joule demonstrates the mechanical equivalent of heat, an important step in the development of thermodynamics.
- Doppler experiment (1845): Christian Doppler arranges to have trumpets played from a passing train. The ground-observed pitch was higher than that played when the train was approaching then lower than that played as the train passed and moved away, demonstrating the Doppler effect.
- Foucault pendulum (1851): Léon Foucault's creates a pendulum to demonstrate the Coriolis effect and the rotation of the Earth.
- Michelson–Morley experiment (1887): exposes weaknesses of the prevailing variant of the theory of luminiferous aether.
- Hertz wireless experiments (1887): Heinrich Hertz demonstrates free space electromagnetic waves, predicted by Maxwell's equations, with a simple dipole antenna and spark gap oscillator.
- Thomson's experiments with cathode rays (1897): J. J. Thomson's cathode ray tube experiments (discovers the electron and its negative charge).
- Eötvös experiment (1909): Loránd Eötvös publishes the result of the second series of experiments, clearly demonstrating that inertial and gravitational mass are one and the same.
- Oil-drop experiment (1909): Robert Millikan demonstrates that electric charge occurs as quanta (whole units).
- Geiger–Marsden experiments (1911): Ernest Rutherford's gold foil experiment demonstrated that the positive charge and mass of an atom is concentrated in a small, central atomic nucleus, disproving the then-popular plum pudding model of the atom.

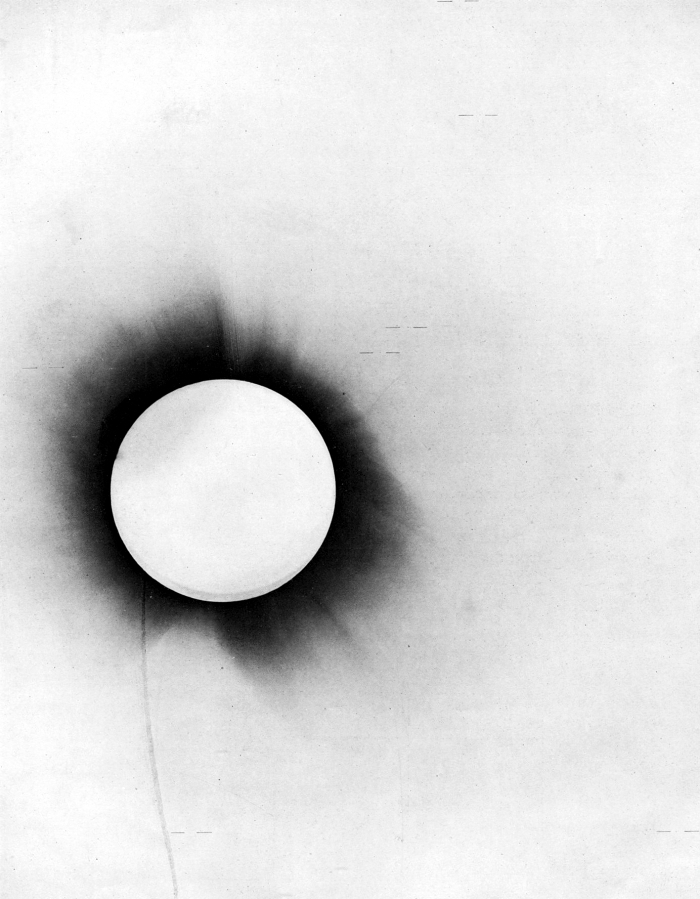
Plate produced by Arthur Eddington of the 1919 eclipse.

- Eddington experiment (1919): Arthur Eddington leads an expedition to the island of Principe to observe a total solar eclipse (gravitational lensing). This allows for an observation of the bending of starlight under gravity, a prediction of Albert Einstein's theory of relativity. It was confirmed (although it was later shown that the margin of error was as great as the observed bending).
- Stern–Gerlach experiment (1920): Otto Stern and Walther Gerlach demonstrates particle spin.
- Chicago Pile-1 (1942): Enrico Fermi and Leó Szilárd build the first critical nuclear reactor (1942)
- Wu experiment (1956): Chien-Shiung Wu leads the team that disproves the conservation of parity in particle physics.
- Cowan–Reines neutrino experiment (1955): Clyde L. Cowan and Frederick Reines confirm the existence of the neutrino.
- Hafele-Keating experiment (1971): Joseph C. Hafele and Richard E. Keating show that atomic clocks flown around the world exhibit differences which are consistent with the predictions of special and general relativity.
- Scout rocket experiment (1976): confirms the time dilation effect of gravity.
- Aspect's experiment (1982): Alain Aspect demonstrates the violation of Bell inequalities in quantum entanglement in the 1980s.

== Psychology ==
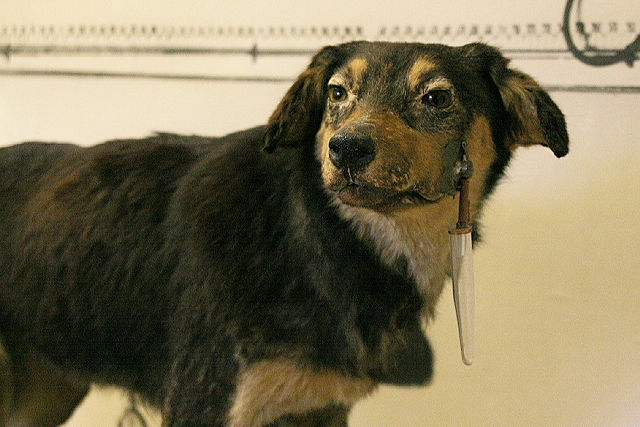
One of Pavlov's dogs with a surgically implanted cannula to measure salivation, Pavlov Museum, 2005

- Ivan Pavlov's experiments with dogs and classical conditioning (1900s).
- John B. Watson and Rosalie Rayner conduct the Little Albert experiment showing evidence of classical conditioning (1920)
- The Asch conformity experiments shows how group pressure can persuade an individual to conform to an obviously wrong opinion (1951)
- B. F. Skinner's demonstrations of operant conditioning (1930s–1960s)
- Harry Harlow's experiments with baby monkeys and wire and cloth surrogate mothers (1957–1974)
- Stanley Milgram's experiments on human obedience (1963)
- Walter Mischel's marshmallow experiment showing the importance to life outcomes of the ability to delay gratification (beginning late 1960s)
- Philip Zimbardo's Stanford prison experiment (1971)
- Allan and Beatrix Gardner's attempts to teach American Sign Language to the chimpanzee Washoe (1970s)
- Martin Seligman studies learned helplessness in dogs (1970s)
- Rosenhan experiment (1972). It involved the use of healthy associates or "pseudopatients", who briefly simulated auditory hallucinations in an attempt to gain admission to 12 different psychiatric hospitals. The hospital staff failed to detect a single pseudopatient. The study is considered an important and influential criticism of psychiatric diagnosis.
- Kansas City preventive patrol experiment (1972–1973) It was designed to test the assumption that the presence (or potential presence) of police officers in marked cars reduced the likelihood of a crime being committed. No relationship was found.
- Elizabeth Loftus' and John C. Palmer's car crash experiment shows that leading questions can produce false memories (1974)
- Benjamin Libet's experiment on free will shows that a readiness potential appears before the notion of doing the task enters conscious experience, sparking debate about the illusory nature of free will yet again. (1983)
- Vilayanur S. Ramachandran's experiment on phantom limbs with the Mirror Box throw light on the nature of 'learned paralysis' (1998)

== See also ==
- List of thought experiments
- Timeline of scientific experiments
