= Yaeta Endo =

Japanese biochemist and professor

Yaeta Endo is a Japanese biochemist and professor well known for developing the cell-free protein expression system based on wheat germ.

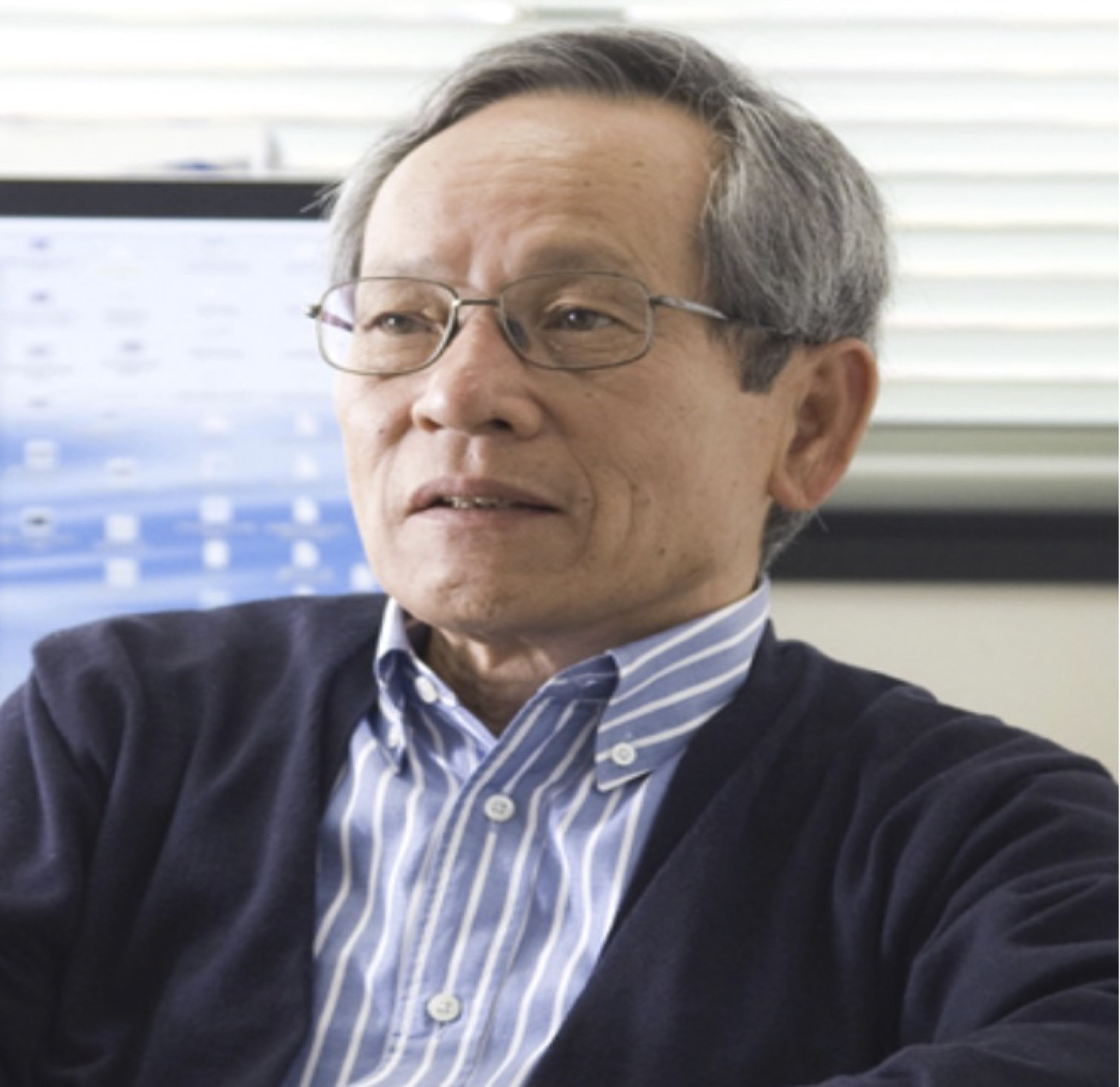
Yaeta Endo

== Early life and education ==
Born Yaeta Endo (遠藤 弥重太, Endo Yaeta) in 1946 in Tokushima Prefecture, which is located in Shikoku island, western Japan. He obtained his first degree in 1969 from Tokushima University, School of Medicine and subsequently his Ph.D. degree from the same university in 1975.

== Scientific career ==
Endo joined the Department of Nutritional Biochemistry, Tokushima University Graduate School in 1975 as an assistant professor. Between 1980 and 1982 he worked as a postdoctoral fellow in Dr. Ira G. Wool's lab at the Cummings Life Science Center, University of Chicago. He returned to Japan in 1984 when he joined the Department of Biochemistry, Yamanashi Medical College as an associate professor. In 1992, he moved to Ehime University and joined the Department of Applied Chemistry School of Engineering as a full professor. Its during this time that he started developing the wheat germ protein expression system. Later on he started the Venture Business Laboratory, Ehime University.

== Wheat Germ Cell-free Protein Expression system ==
Wheat germ cell-free protein synthesis technology is based on the idea of carrying out DNA transcription and translation reactions in a test tube using the wheat translation machinery.

== Retirement ==
He retired in 2011 becoming a special university professor emeritus of Ehime University, a position he holds to this date. Starting in 2011, he spent five years working as a visiting professor at the University of California, Santa Cruz. Later on he took a similar position at Ehime Prefectural University of Health Sciences. In 2021, he wrote an article about his career in research and future directions of his field.

== Honors ==
He won many medals including:

- 3rd Yamazaki-Teiichi Prize in 2003.
- Kei Arima Memorial Japan Bioindustry Association Award in 2006.
- The Commendation for Science and Technology by the Minister of Education, Culture, Sports, Science and Technology in 2008.
- Ehime News Paper’s Award 2021.
