= Barry P. Rosen =

American biochemist

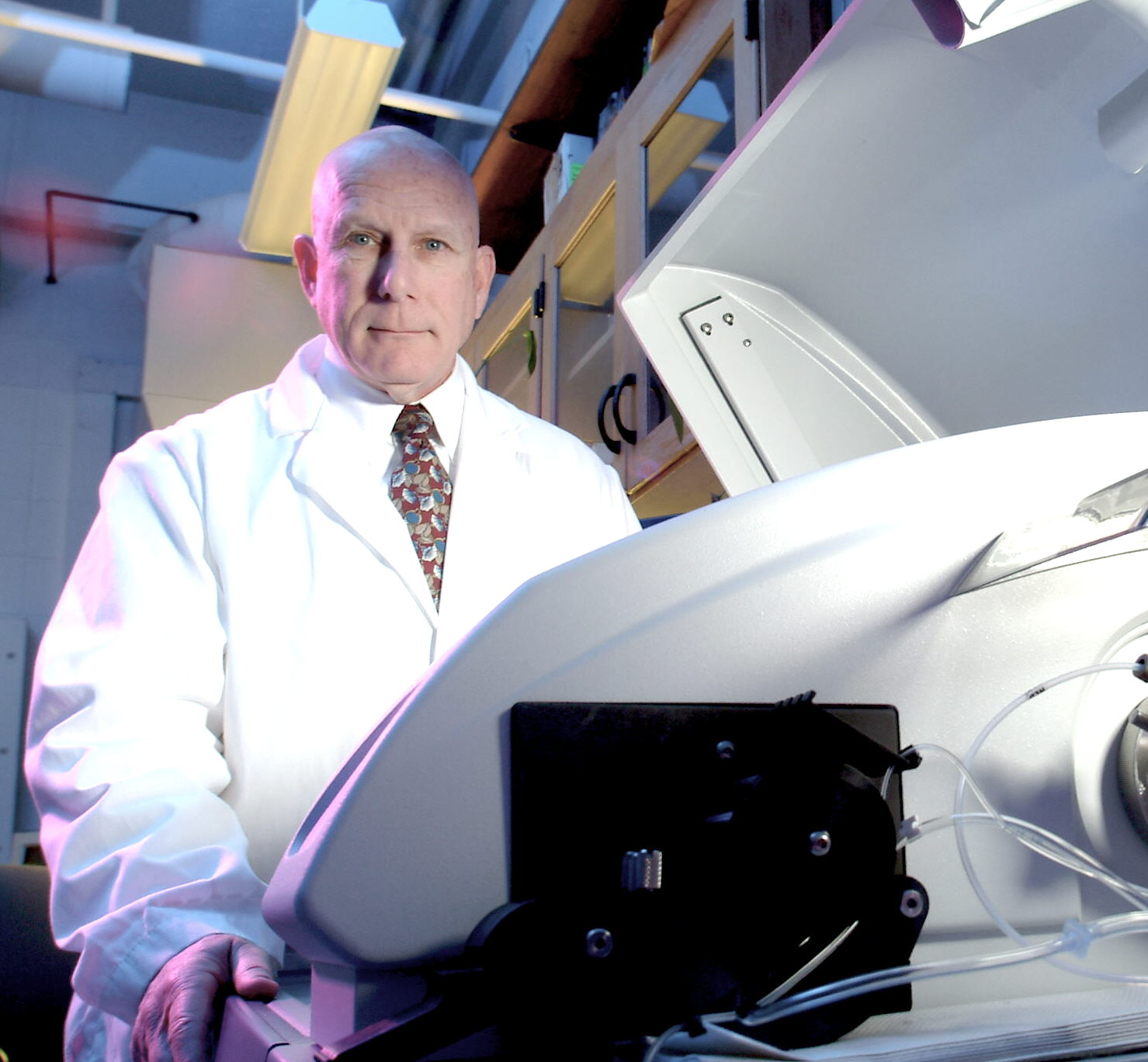
- Barry Philip Rosen
- Born: June 18, 1944; Hartford, Connecticut
- Education: Trinity College (Connecticut), University of Connecticut
- Known for: Discovery of genes for transport and detoxification of arsenic and antimony
- Scientific career
- Fields: Biochemistry, especially handling of heavy metals
- Workplaces: Cornell University, Wayne State University, Florida International University
- Academic advisors: Leon A. Heppel

Barry P. Rosen is an American biochemist and molecular biologist. He is a Distinguished University Professor Emeritus at Florida International University (FIU) and was previously the Associate Dean for Basic Research and Graduate Programs at the FIU Herbert Wertheim College of Medicine (HWCOM). Rosen is recognized for his pioneering research into the molecular mechanisms of toxic metalloid transport and detoxification, particularly regarding arsenic and antimony.

== Early life and education ==
Rosen was born in Hartford, Connecticut on June 18, 1944 and graduated from Trinity College (Connecticut) with a Bachelor of Science in Biology. Rosen conducted his graduate studies at the University of Connecticut followed by an NIH postdoctoral fellowship at Cornell University under the mentorship of Leon A. Heppel.

== Career ==
Rosen has served as a professor and chair of the Department of Biochemistry and Molecular Biology at the Wayne State University School of Medicine, where he remains Distinguished Professor Emeritus, before joining FIU as Associate Dean at the HWCOM.

Rosen held one of the longest-running continuously funded research grants from the National Institutes of Health (NIH), spanning over 40 years of continuous support through the National Institute of General Medical Sciences.

== Research and discoveries ==
Rosen's laboratory focuses on how cells transport, transform and detoxify heavy metals and metalloids.

=== Discovery of genes for the two arsenic biogeochemical cycles ===
Beginning in 1982, the Rosen laboratory identified the microbial genes and proteins of the environmental arsenic biogeochemical cycle, including arsenic transporters, transcriptional regulators, and enzymes of biotransformation, and characterized the encoded proteins at biochemical and structural levels. Rosen demonstrated that there are multiple efflux transporters that reduce the intracellular concentration of arsenic, conferring resistance, such as the ArsAB pump and the related ArsD arsenic chaperone, which was subsequently highlighted by the journal Nature in their "Research Highlights" coverage. Rosen showed that the genes are regulated by members of the ArsR family of arsenic-responsive transcriptional repressors.

In 2006, Rosen’s laboratory made a breakthrough with the co-discovery of the Rhodopseudomonas palustris arsM gene for arsenic methylation. In a followup Rosen co-discovered the gene for a highly thermostable arsenic methyltransferase (ArsM) from a eukaryotic red alga found in Yellowstone National Park hotsprings. The study was selected by the editors of the Proceedings of the National Academy of Sciences (PNAS) for special independent coverage in the journal's "In This Issue" section, which highlighted the work's importance in understanding evolutionary arsenic detoxification in extreme environments. These studies led to the insight that an environmental organoarsenic biogeochemical cycle exists in parallel with the inorganic arsenic biogeochemical cycle.

=== Aquaglyceroporins and arsenic transport ===
In 1997, Rosen demonstrated that antimonite is transported into cells via the aquaglyceroporin GlpF in Escherichia coli. Following this breakthrough, he collaborated with Nobel Laureate Peter Agre to establish that mammalian aquaglyceroporins (specifically AQP7 and AQP9) also facilitate the transport of toxic metalloids across mammalian cell membranes. In recognition of this discovery, Agre credited Rosen by name during his December 8, 2003, Nobel Prize Lecture in Stockholm for uncovering the pathway by which arsenic enters human tissue.

=== Environmental and agricultural impact ===
Rosen's research regarding how plants absorb and process toxic elements has had significant implications for global food safety, particularly concerning the world's rice supply. His findings on the pathways of arsenic accumulation in paddy rice crops were prominently featured as independent secondary news items in Science magazine. These studies have been summarized in a review article in Annual Review of Earth and Planetary Sciences.

=== Discovery of arsinothricin ===
In 2019, Rosen co-led an international collaboration that discovered arsinothricin (AST), a novel arsenic-based, natural broad-spectrum antibiotic produced by soil bacteria. This research opened new avenues for targeting antibiotic-resistant pathogens. The recognition that natural products containing arsenic can be antibiotics is described in a recent review article about arsensic in medicine.

== Awards and honors ==
- Elected a Fellow of the American Academy of Microbiology (1980) for outstanding contributions to the field of microbiology
- Elected a Fellow of the American Association for the Advancement of Science (AAAS) (2014) for distinguished contributions to biochemistry and environmental toxicology.
- Elected a Senior Member of the National Academy of Inventors (NAI) (2023) in recognition of his achievements in translating academic research into impactful inventions and patents.
