= Leslie Barnett =

British molecular biologist (1920–2002)

- Born: 12 October 1920; London, England
- Died: 10 February 2002 (aged 81)
- Other name: Margaret Leslie Collard
- Occupation: Molecular biologist
- Known for: Frameshift mutations

Leslie Barnett (born 12 October 1920 as Margaret Leslie Collard – died 10 February 2002) was a British biologist who worked with Francis Crick, Sydney Brenner, and Richard Watts-Tobin to genetically demonstrate the triplet nature of the code of protein translation through the Crick, Brenner, Barnett, Watts-Tobin et al. experiment of 1961, which discovered frameshift mutations; this insight provided early elucidation of the nature of the genetic code.

In her professional life, Barnett was a microbiologist who joined the Laboratory of Molecular Biology in Cambridge, where she worked as an assistant mainly with Crick and later Brenner, with whom she remained for many years until he left and she retired. During this long period, Barnett was involved in a number of the important 20th-century advances made in molecular biology and genetics.

== Career ==
=== Early career ===
At the beginning of the Second World War, she had started training in the Institute of Agriculture in Essex; but in 1939 took a job in Felixstowe as a milk testing apprentice at a local dairy, and later with United Dairies in London. After evacuation to Banbury and several further jobs she returned to London where she met and married James in 1945. He insisted that she took up the offer of a place at Reading University and she remembered these as some of the happiest days of her life, studying for her BSc in dairying. Leslie continued to be fond of James despite their divorce when the children were quite young. She had two daughters, Penny and Marion.

Barnett came to work as a technician in the MRC Unit shortly before the move from the Cavendish Laboratory to "The Hut" in Cambridge, which would later go on to become the MRC Laboratory of Molecular Biology (LMB). Her role was to help with the computing for the crystallographers. On the arrival of Sydney Brenner, however, help was needed to set up the phage research and then to prepare for the arrival of Seymour Benzer and other American visitors that autumn. Leslie worked with Vernon Ingram in determining the GLU to VAL amino acid change in the beta chain of Hb responsible for the sickle cell phenotype; this was the first molecular disease characterized. Barnett showed her versatility when she transferred to Brenner's programme and made a major contribution to the laboratory work, becoming a co-author of their two major papers on the results. In 1966 she was appointed Senior Tutor at the new graduate college, Clare Hall, Cambridge. She proved very popular in this work.

On Brenner's retirement in 1986, Barnett left the LMB to work for him in the new MRC Molecular Genetics Unit in Addenbrooke's Hospital. She trained the late Francis Crick in experimental work on phage and assisted him.

Barnett also helped set up Sydney Brenner's laboratory in Singapore, many years later.

=== Later career ===
Barnett was amongst the early Fellows elected to join Clare Hall, the newly founded graduate college. In 1972, she became a tutor for graduate students; in 1975, she took over the leading role of Senior Tutor, which she held until her retirement in 1985. She was remembered by hundreds of students of various nationalities, ages and subjects for her "steadfast care, wisdom in solving their problems, and motherly love."

Barnett played a leading role in college affairs, particularly in the organising of social events and parties and will be remembered with great affection by her colleagues and other friends associated with the college. As a token of her contribution to the college the Governing Body has named a student residence the Leslie Barnett House, and a bronze head by the late Lois Tilbrook represents another tribute to her on the site. On retirement she was elected to an Emeritus Fellowship and attended regularly until her last illness.

== Scientific papers ==
- Brenner, S., Benzer, S., and Barnett, L. 1958. "Distribution of proflavin-induced mutations in the genetic fine structure", Nature 182: 983–5.
- Brenner, S. and Barnett, L. 1959 "Genetic and chemical studies on the head protein of bacteriophages T2 and T4', in Structure and Function of Genetic Elements. Report of Symposium Held June 1–3, 1959. Brookhaven Symposia 12 (Upton, NY: Brookhaven National Laboratory).
- Brenner, S., Barnett, L., Crick, F.H.C. and Orgel, A. 1961 "The theory of mutangensis", The Journal of Molecular Biology 3: 121–4.
- Crick, F.H.C., Barnett, L., Brenner, S. and Watts-Tobin, R.J. 1961. "General nature of the genetic code for proteins", Nature 192: 1227–32.
- Karn, J., Brenner, S., and Barnett, L. 1983. "Protein structural domains in the Caenorhabditis elegans unc-54 myosin heavy chain gene are not separated by introns", Proceedings of the National Academy of Sciences 80(14): 4253–4257.
- Karn, J., Brenner, S., Barnett, L., and Cesareni, G. 1980. "Novel bacteriophage lambda cloning vector", Proceedings of the National Academy of Sciences 77(9): 5172–5176.

== Recognition ==
In 1978 at Clare Hall a second neighbouring house in Cambridge, now called Leslie Barnett House, was obtained for graduate student accommodation; it was named after the popular Senior Tutor.

== Sources ==
- Sydney Brenner; 'My Life in Science', BioMed Central 2001, 199pp ISBN 0-9540278-0-9
- Soraya De Chadarevian; Designs For Life: Molecular Biology After World War II, CUP 2002, 444 pp; ISBN 0-521-57078-6
- Francis Crick; What Mad Pursuit: A Personal View of Scientific Discovery (Basic Books reprint edition, 1990) ISBN 0-465-09138-5
- Georgina Ferry; 'Max Perutz and the Secret of Life', (Chatto & Windus 2007) 352pp, ISBN 978-0-7011-7695-2. For uncaptioned picture.
- John Finch; 'A Nobel Fellow On Every Floor', Medical Research Council 2008, 381 pp, ISBN 978-1-84046-940-0; this book is all about the MRC Laboratory of Molecular Biology, Cambridge.
- Errol Friedberg, "Sydney Brenner: A Biography" pub. CSHL Press October 2010, ISBN 0-87969-947-7.
- Horace Freeland Judson, "The Eighth Day of Creation. Makers of the Revolution in Biology"; Penguin Books 1995, first published by Jonathan Cape, 1977; ISBN 0-14-017800-7.
- Robert Olby; "Francis Crick: Hunter of Life's Secrets", Cold Spring Harbor Laboratory Press,ISBN 978-0-87969-798-3, published on 25 August 2009.
- Max Perutz; What a Time I Am Having: Selected Letters, CSHL Press 2008, 506pp ISBN 978-0-87969-864-5. For captioned picture.
- Matt Ridley; Francis Crick: Discoverer of the Genetic Code (Eminent Lives) first published in June 2006 in the US and then in the UK September 2006, by HarperCollins Publishers; 192 pp, ISBN 0-06-082333-X; in paperback, by Atlas Books (with index), ISBN 978-0-00-721331-3.
