= Peter Hetherington =

British journalist

Peter Hetherington is a British journalist. He writes regularly for The Guardian on land, communities, and regeneration. He is also a vice-president, and past chair of the Town and Country Planning Association, former regional affairs and northern editor of The Guardian and the author of the 2015 book, Whose Land is Our Land? The use and abuse of Britain's forgotten acres, and the 2021 book, Land Renewed: Reworking the Countryside.
