= Nirenberg and Leder experiment =

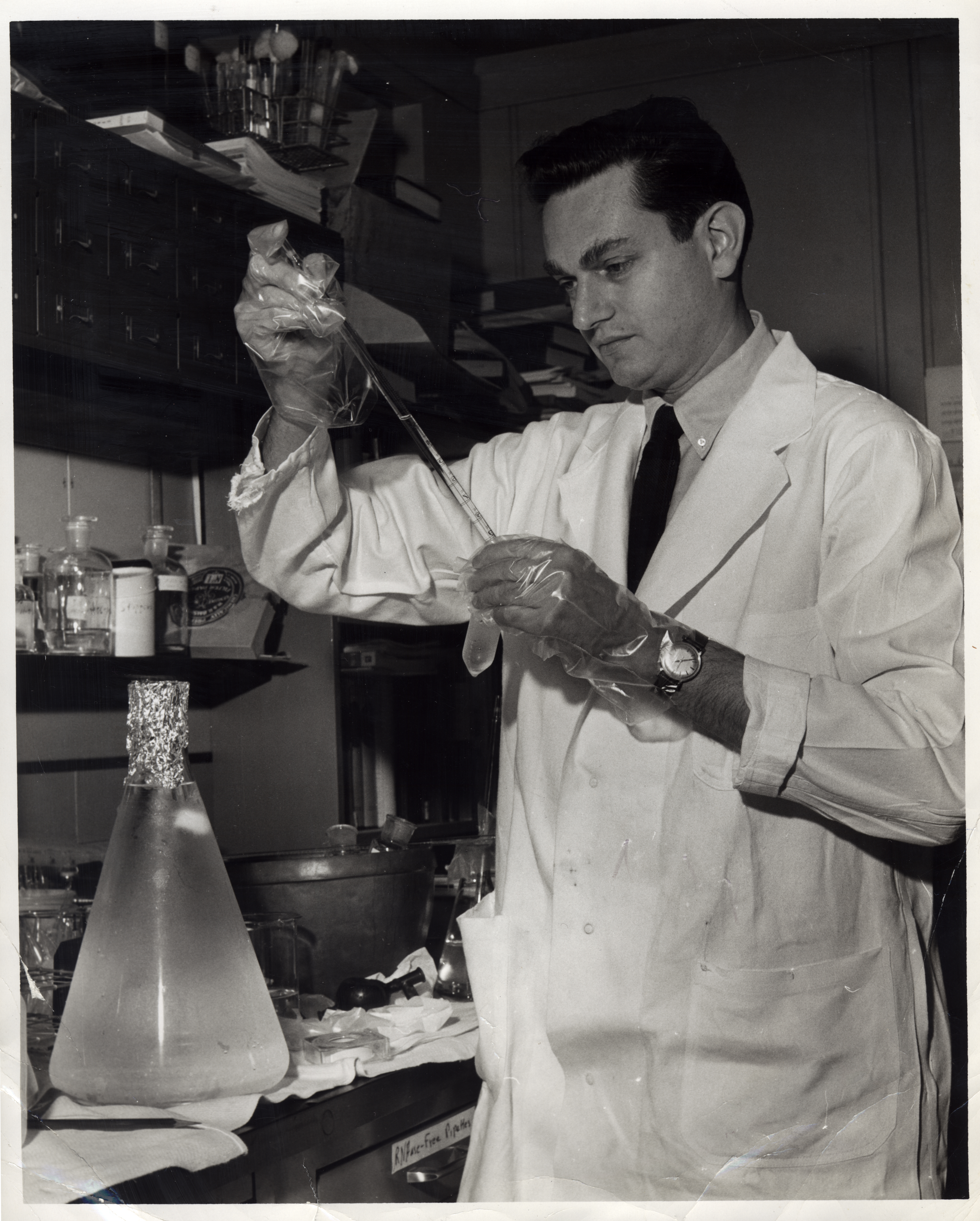
Marshall Nirenberg

The Nirenberg and Leder experiment was a scientific experiment performed in 1964 by Marshall W. Nirenberg and Philip Leder. The experiment elucidated the triplet nature of the genetic code and allowed the remaining ambiguous codons in the genetic code to be deciphered.

In this experiment, using a ribosome binding assay called the triplet binding assay, various combinations of mRNA were passed through a filter which contained ribosomes. Unique triplets promoted the binding of specific tRNAs to the ribosome. By associating the tRNA with its specific amino acid, it was possible to determine the triplet mRNA sequence that coded for each amino acid.

== Background ==
Oswald Avery discovered that the substance responsible for producing inheritable change in the disease-causing bacteria was neither a protein nor a lipid, rather deoxyribonucleic acid (DNA). He and his colleagues Colin MacLeod and Maclyn McCarty suggested that DNA was responsible for transferring genetic information. Later, Erwin Chargaff discovered that the makeup of DNA differs from one species to another. These experiments helped pave the way for the discovery of the structure of DNA. In 1953, with the help of Maurice Wilkins and Rosalind Franklin’s X-ray crystallography, James Watson and Francis Crick proposed DNA is structured as a double helix.

In the 1960s, one main DNA mystery scientists needed to figure out was in translation how many bases would be in each code word, or codon. Scientists knew there were a total of four bases (guanine, cytosine, adenine, and thymine). They also knew that were 20 known amino acids. George Gamow suggested that the genetic code was made of three nucleotides per amino acid. He reasoned that because there are 20 amino acids and only four bases, the coding units could not be single (4 combinations) or pairs (only 16 combinations). Rather, he thought triplets (64 possible combinations) were the coding unit of the genetic code. However, he proposed that the triplets were overlapping and non-degenerate.

Seymour Benzer in the late 1950s had developed an assay using phage mutations which provided the first detailed linearly structured map of a genetic region. Crick felt he could use mutagenesis and genetic recombination phage to further delineate the nature of the genetic code. In the frameshift mutation experiment by Crick, Brenner, and colleagues, using these phages, the triplet nature of the genetic code was confirmed. They used frameshift mutations and a process called reversions, to add and delete various numbers of nucleotides. When a nucleotide triplet was added to or deleted from the DNA sequence, the encoded protein was minimally affected. Thus, they concluded that the genetic code is a triplet code because it did not cause a frameshift in the reading frame. They correctly concluded that the code is degenerate, that triplets are not overlapping, and that each nucleotide sequence is read from a specific starting point.

== Experimental work ==
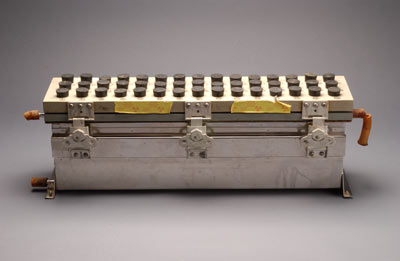
The Multi-plater, developed by Leder, helped speed up the process of deciphering the genetic code.

The very first amino acid codon (UUU encoding phenylalanine) was deciphered by Nirenberg and his postdoc Heinrich Matthaei (see Nirenberg and Matthaei experiment) using long synthetic RNA. However, when similar RNAs are made containing more than one RNA base, the order of the bases was random. For example, a long RNA could be made that had a ratio of C to U of 2:1, and so would contain codons CCU, CUC, UCC at high frequency. When translated by ribosomes, this would produce a protein containing the amino acids proline, leucine, and serine; but it was not possible to say which codon matched which amino acid.

Instead, Nirenberg's group turned to very short synthetic RNAs. They found that the trinucleotide UUU (which is the codon for phenylalanine), was able to cause specific association of phenylalanine-charged tRNA with ribosomes. This association could be detected by passing the mixture through a nitrocellulose filter: the filter captures ribosomes but not free tRNA; however if tRNA was associated with the ribosome, it would also be captured (along with the radioactive phenylalanine attached to the tRNA). They similarly found that trinucleotides AAA or CCC caused ribosome association of lysine-tRNA or proline-tRNA, respectively.

So an experimental plan was clear: synthesize all 64 different trinucleotide combinations, and use the filter assay with tRNAs charged with all 20 amino acids, to see which amino acid associated with which trinucleotide. However, obtaining pure trinucleotides with mixed base sequences, for example GUU, was a daunting challenge. Leder's pioneering studies used trinucleotides made by breaking down long random poly-GU RNA with nuclease and purifying specific trinucleotides by paper chromatography: he determined that GUU, UGU, and UUG encoded the amino acids valine, cysteine and leucine, respectively. Subsequently, Nirenberg's group constructed trinucleotides by using DNA polymerases coupled with nucleotides and RNA polymerases to create the long random poly-GU RNA as well as artificially replicate the purified trinucleotides. Once high enough concentrations of mRNA were produced, degradation and reformation of polymerase products was accomplished through enzymatic processes. For example, AGU could be made from AG and U with polynucleotide phosphorylase; UAG could be made from AG and U with ribonuclease A in a high concentration of methanol. Nirenberg's postdoc Merton Bernfield used these techniques to determine that UUU and UUC encode phenylalanine, UCU and UCC encode serine, and CCC and CCU encode proline, highlighting a pattern in the way the genetic code redundantly encodes amino acids. Many others in the Nirenberg lab and at NIH contributed to the full decipherment of the genetic code.

== Reception and legacy ==
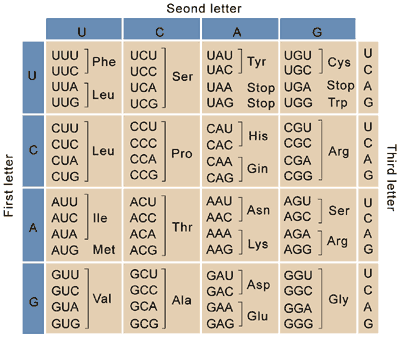
Genetic Code Chart

By the Cold Spring Harbor Symposium of 1966, between Nirenberg and Khorana the genetic code was almost completely decoded. Nirenberg was awarded the 1968 Nobel Prize in Physiology or Medicine. He shared the award with Har Gobind Khorana of the University of Wisconsin and Robert W. Holley of the Salk Institute. Working independently, Khorana had mastered the synthesis of nucleic acids, and Holley had discovered the exact chemical structure of transfer-RNA.

The New York Times said of Nirenberg's work that "the science of biology has reached a new frontier," leading to "a revolution far greater in its potential significance than the atomic or hydrogen bomb." Most of the scientific community saw these experiments as highly important and beneficial. However, there were some who were concerned with the new era of molecular genetics. For example, Arne Tiselius, the 1948 Nobel Laureate in Chemistry, asserted that knowledge of the genetic code could "lead to methods of tampering with life, of creating new diseases, of controlling minds, of influencing heredity, even perhaps in certain desired directions."

== See also ==
- Crick, Brenner et al. experiment
- Nirenberg and Matthaei experiment
- List of experiments
