= Ethel Watts (accountant) =

English accountant (1895–1963)

Ethel Watts (1895 – 1963) was an English accountant who is remembered for being the first woman to become a chartered accountant through examination.

== Early life ==
She was born in London on 3 January 1895, the eldest of three daughters of police officer John Watts and his wife Caroline, née Poole, a police matron. She was educated at Coburn Girls’ School, Bedford College, and Royal Holloway college, where she graduated with a BA in history in 1916.

During World War I, she became an administrative assistant at the Ministry of Food, serving for a period as the private secretary to the Director of Oils and Fats. She had intended to train as a lawyer, but her time at the Ministry of Food gave her an interest in business, so she trained as an accountant on the advice of Sir Harry Peat.

== Accountancy career ==
Watts passed the British Institute of Chartered Accountants' exam in 1924. She served her articles with S. Williams of Manchester and Aberystwyth before joining W.B. Peat and Co. After receiving a practising certificate in April 1925, she briefly served in Homersham & Watts with Miriam Homersham, before setting up her own firm, E. Watts & Co, which mostly provided tax advice.

She remained committed to helping other women enter accountancy: taking on women clerks herself, speaking and writing about her experience, and in 1945, founding the Women Chartered Accountants’ Dining Society. She offered her services as an accountant to the London and National Society for Women's Service, where she had sat on committees since the 1920s, and which she continued to support when it became the Fawcett Society. Committees she supported with her services included the Equal Pay Campaign Committee.

== Personal life and death ==
In 1929, Watts married medical doctor Oscar Tobin. They had a son, Richard Watts-Tobin, in 1934; in later life, Richard would become a physicist and co-author on key scientific work to understand the genetic code of DNA. The couple hyphenated their surnames but Watts continued practicing under her maiden name.

She died in Wimbledon, London, on 19 November 1963.

== See also ==
- Mary Harris Smith, who became the first female chartered accountant in May 1920 when she was admitted to the Institute of Chartered Accountants in England and Wales in her seventies after practicing as an accountant since 1887, but without having been allowed to sit the examination.
