= Timothy A Stewart =

New Zealand molecular biologist

Timothy A Stewart (born 30 September 1952) is a molecular biologist. He graduated from the University of Otago (BScHons, PhD.).

Stewart was born in Christchurch, New Zealand. He was a pioneer in the technique of transferring recombinant genes to mice (transgenic mice) and in 1988 he and Philip Leder were granted a patent on a genetically engineered mammal. This "oncomouse" patent was the first to be issued covering a higher life form.

From 1984 to 2003 Stewart was a scientist at Genentech where he developed the concept that the type I interferons might be a significant component in the initiation or progression of type I diabetes.

He has published 61 peer reviewed papers listed in Scopus; the most highly cited has 1013 citations to it, and he has 31 papers with 34 citations or more.
