= Merton Bernfield =

American pediatrician and cell biologist

Merton Ronald Bernfield
- Born: April 9, 1938; Chicago
- Died: March 18, 2002 (aged 63–64); Boston
- Education: University of Illinois
- Known for: Contribution to solving the genetic code, Discovery of syndecan
- Spouse: Audrey Rivkin Bernfield
- Scientific career
- Fields: Pediatrics, Cell Biology
- Workplaces: Stanford University; Harvard University

Merton R. Bernfield (1938 – March 18, 2002) was an American pediatrician and cell biologist. In his postdoctoral work with Marshall Nirenberg, he made important contributions to deciphering the genetic code. He helped found the field of glycobiology, showed the dynamic nature of the extracellular matrix, and discovered the syndecans, a family of highly glycosylated proteins on the surfaces of cells that influence tissue repair, metabolism, the formation of tumors and the development of immune responses.

He was a professor of Pediatrics at Stanford University starting in 1967, serving as chair of the Program in Human Biology, associate director of the birth defects clinic at Stanford Hospital and co-director of its premature infant follow-up clinic. He joined the Harvard Medical School faculty in 1989 as the Clement Smith Professor of Pediatrics and Cell Biology and Director of the Joint Program in Neonatology at the Children's Hospital, Boston. He was a member of the Institute of Medicine at the National Academy of Sciences.

The Merton Bernfield Memorial Award for graduate students and postdocs was established by the American Society for Cell Biology.
