= Philip Leder =

American geneticist (1934–2020)

- Born: November 19, 1934; Washington, D.C.
- Died: February 2, 2020 (aged 85); Chestnut Hill, Massachusetts, U.S.
- Education: Harvard University (M.D., 1960)
- Known for: Nirenberg and Leder experiment; genetic code
- Awards: Richard Lounsbery Award (1981); Dickson Prize (1981); Albert Lasker Medical Research Award (1987); National Medal of Science (1989); Heineken Prize (1990); William Allan Award (1997); Robert Koch Prize (Gold, 2008); Harvey Prize
- Scientific career
- Fields: Genetics; Molecular biology; Biochemistry

Philip Leder (November 19, 1934 – February 2, 2020) was an American geneticist.

== Early life and education ==
Leder was born in Washington, D.C., and studied at Harvard University, graduating in 1956. In 1960, he graduated from Harvard Medical School and completed his medical residency at the University of Minnesota.

== Scientific accomplishments ==
Leder made several contributions in each decade of the modern genetics era from the 1960s through the 1990s. He may be best known for his early work with Marshall Nirenberg in the elucidation of the genetic code and the Nirenberg and Leder experiment. Since then, he has made several contributions in the fields of molecular genetics, immunology and the genetics of cancer. His group defined the base sequence of a complete mammalian gene (the gene for beta globin), which enabled him to determine its organization in detail, including its associated control signals. His research into the structure of genes which carry the code for antibody molecules was of major significance. The main focus of this inquiry was the question of how the vast diversity of antibody molecules is formed by a limited number of encoded genes. Leder's work on antibody genes was later extended to research into Burkitt's lymphoma, a tumour of antibody-producing cells, which involves the oncogene c-myc. This was crucial in understanding the origin of this type of tumor. In 1988, Leder and Timothy Stewart were granted the first patent on a genetically engineered animal. This animal, a mouse which had genes injected into its embryo to increase susceptibility to cancer, became known as the "oncomouse" and has been used in the laboratory study of cancer therapies.

== Positions ==
In 1968, Leder headed the Biochemistry Department of the Graduate Program of the Foundation for Advanced Education in the Sciences at the National Institute of Health. In 1972 he was appointed director of the Laboratory for Molecular Genetics at the same institution and remained in that post until 1980, when he returned to Harvard Medical School as the founder of the newly formed Department of Genetics, occupying the John Emory Andrus Chair. He retired from this position in 2008 and died of complications from Parkinson's disease on February 2, 2020.

== Awards ==
Leder has been awarded various honors and was a member of the National Academy of Sciences, the American Academy of Arts and Sciences and the Institute of Medicine. His many prizes include the Golden Plate Award of the American Academy of Achievement (1981), the Lasker Award (1987), the National Medal of Science (1991), the Harvey Prize, and the Heineken Prize awarded by the Royal Netherlands Academy of Arts and Sciences. In November 2015 he has been awarded an honorary doctoral degree from the Medical Faculty of the University of Basel for his lifetime achievements.
