= Women's Pioneer Housing =

British housing association for professional women

Women's Pioneer Housing is a British housing association founded in 1920, the first dedicated to housing single women.

== History ==
Women's Pioneer Housing was founded in 1920, to help provide housing for the new generation of single, professional women in London following the First World War.

It was founded by Etheldred Browning a former Irish suffragist who had run the women’s section of the Garden City and Town Planning Association (GCTPA). Other founding members included Geraldine Lennox of the Women's Social and Political Union (WSPU), Lady Rhondda, and Ray Strachey. Sydney Mary Bushell, a member of the executive committee of the GCTPA and hon sec of their women’s section, was also a founder. They incorporated Women's Pioneer Housing as a public utility company on 4 October 1920 ‘to cater for the housing requirements of professional and other women of moderate means who require individual homes at moderate rents’.

They raised money to purchase its first property, 167 Holland Park Avenue, in 1921. Eleanor Shelley-Rolls was a significant investor, served on the Committee of Management between 1923-1930 and was President in 1931. Her wealth and social connections were important in WPH's fundraising drives.

At the society's 1924 dinner, Mrs. C. S. Peel explained that the association "aimed at providing women workers with houses where there would be scope for individual tastes, and where they could live surrounded by their household gods". After weathering some financial problems in the 1920s the association was able to expand in the 1930s. By 1936 they had 36 properties, primarily in west London and one in Brighton, run on a co-operative basis. Investors included Bertha Newcombe.

Skilled women contractors were central to the organisation's development, including the architect Gertrude Leverkus and the first woman chartered accountants, Ethel Watts and Miriam Homersham. Etheldred Browning ran the organisation until her retirement in 1938.

== Housing provision ==
Women's Pioneer Housing is still active as a social housing provider for women, with offices at Wood Lane, White City, west London. The Chief Executive since 2022 is Tracey Downie, former Executive Director of Housing Management at Homes for Haringey.

It is registered as a Co-operative & Community Benefit Society with the Financial Conduct Authority and as a Registered Social Landlord with the Homes and Communities Agency.

It continues to house single women, mostly now nominated by local authorities.

Plans for a new tower block at the organisation's base in Wood Lane were announced in 2019. After refused permission, the revised plans were eventually granted planning permission in November 2022.

In May 2019, it explored a possible merger with Housing for Women but this was called off later that same year.

The organisation's employees celebrated its centenary in 2020, with an exhibition Pioneering Courage: Housing and the Working Woman 1919 – 1939 based on three years of research into their history.
