= Miriam Homersham =

English accountant (1892 – 1936)

- Born: 5 June 1892
- Died: July 27, 1936 (aged 44)
- Education: Sutton High School, St Hugh’s College, Oxford
- Occupation: Accountant
- Known for: One of first women accountants, co-founder of Women's Pioneer Housing

Miriam Margarey Homersham (5 June 1892– 27 July 1936) an English accountant who was a co-founder of Women's Pioneer Housing and one of the first English women to start an accountancy practice.

== Early life and education ==
Miriam Margarey Homersham was born in the parish of St Pancras, London on the 5 June 1892 to Miriam Eliza Mary and William Collet Homersham, the eldest of three sisters. Her father was an accountant for the Inland Revenue.

Educated at Sutton High School, she studied at St Hugh’s College, Oxford from 1909 – 1912, taking First Class honours in English with a specialism in Old Norse. Her degree was later awarded in Oxford's first degree ceremony for women in 1920.

== Career ==
After working as a teacher in England and America, Homersham was prompted to train as an accountant by the new opportunities for women after World War I. She earned a gold medal as a member of the Central Association of Accountants, and then joined the Society of Incorporated Accountants and Auditors in 1922, being elected a Fellow in 1925.

Homersham established an accountancy practice in her own name in London. This later became Homersham & Watts with Ethel Watts, the first English woman to qualify as an accountant by examination.

Homersham was a co-founder of Women's Pioneer Housing, the country's first housing association to focus on providing housing for single women, where she served as accountant. She often supported social causes such as clubs for working women by offering her accountancy services for a token fee or at no cost; and she supported other women getting into accountancy.

== Death ==
Homersham died on 27 July 1936, following an attempted suicide six weeks earlier. Her sister Katharine was named executor of her will.
