= Town and Country Planning Association =

UK research and campaigning charity

- Founded: 1899
- Founder: Sir Ebenezer Howard
- Type: Not-for-profit
- Purpose: garden cities, town and country planning, sustainable development, social justice, planning policy, climate change, health, green infrastructure
- Location(s): 17 Carlton House Terrace; London SW1Y 5AS
- Key people: Fiona Howie, Hugh Ellis
- Formerly called: Garden Cities Association; Garden Cities and Town Planning Association

The Town and Country Planning Association (TCPA) is an independent research and campaigning charity founded and based in the United Kingdom. It works to enable homes, places and communities in which everyone can thrive, informed by the Garden City Principles.

== History ==
Founded by Sir Ebenezer Howard in 1899 to promote the idea of the Garden City, the TCPA is Britain's oldest charity concerned with planning, housing and the environment.

The association was first called the Garden City Association, and then the Garden Cities and Town Planning Association, broadening its scope to promote town planning as well as garden cities. It is the first pressure group for planning and predates the formation of the Royal Town Planning Institute.

Women played an active role in the TCPA. Sir Ebenezer Howard said in Garden Cities of To-morrow: "Woman's influence is too often ignored. When the Garden City is built, as it shortly will be, woman's share in the work will be found to have been a large one. Women are among our most active missionaries". In 1903 the TCPA included a 'Women's League'. In 1920 a 'Women's Section' had been established. Two members of the 'Women's Section' founded the Women's Pioneer Housing, Etheldred Browning and Sydney Mary Bushell.

== Vision and values ==
The TCPA has been a reformist movement for over a hundred years – evidenced by its interest in fair shares in development and land value uplift; shared ownership of public open space; participative and entrepreneurial local governance; town and country planned together, and enhancement of the environment – and the need to achieve sustainable communities.

Informed by the Garden City Principles, the TCPA's strategic priorities are to:

- Work to secure a good home for everyone in inclusive, resilient and prosperous communities, which support people to live healthier lives.
- Empower people to have real influence over decisions about their environments and to secure social justice within and between communities.
- Support new and transform existing places to be adaptable to current and future challenges including the climate crisis.

== Activities ==
As part of its educational remit, the TCPA arranges conferences and study tours. The association is not only confined to England but is also involved in a range of European projects.

== Work areas ==
=== Garden cities and new towns ===
Building on its legacy, the TCPA has been setting out a proactive agenda around garden cities, with a positive response from the government. The association believes that a new generation of 21st-century garden cities could help to solve a range of problems such as the acute shortage of housing in the UK and the need to respond to climate change Recently, the Prime Minister has made a statement outlining his support of the garden principles and drafted a prospectus on locally led garden cities. Ebbsfleet has been proposed as a potential new garden city. However, although the site is well-connected it is difficult to see how it could meet all of the Garden City Principles but must genuinely offer affordable homes, according to the TCPA.

=== Climate change ===
The TCPA undertakes research, policy formulation and political influence on climate adaptation and mitigation in the context of spatial planning. This is informed by both UK research and European-funded projects on adaptation, green infrastructure, human health and energy. European-funded projects on climate change adaptation led by the TCPA include Clim-Cap, GRaBs and PERFECT.

The Planning & Climate Change Coalition, which has been brought together by Friends of the Earth and the TCPA, includes over 60 cross-sector organisations and individuals. The Coalition has worked to ensure that the planning system makes a full contribution to meeting the climate change challenge. They have developed planning guidance and model policies on climate change for local authorities in England. The aim of the Coalition is to build a consensus among a wide range of stakeholders on the benefits of guidance on planning for climate change, working with local authorities, Local Enterprise Partnerships and communities. The Coalition has no core funding and no political or corporate affiliations.

=== Community participation and social justice ===
The TCPA works with government and the private sector to campaign for meaningful public participation in the planning and development process. It also supports communities getting engaged in UK planning. This includes a partnership with planning advice charity Planning Aid for London (PAL).

=== Healthy place-making ===
The Garden City movement sought to promote the fact that the way places are planned, designed, built and managed has a significant influence over whether communities are able to live healthy lives. Today, the TCPA continues to promote the creation of healthy places through the publication of research, reports and guidance on issues such as 20-minute neighbourhoods (sometimes referred to as the 15-minute city)

=== Parks and Green Infrastructure ===
The TCPA has been promoting the inclusion of green spaces in urban areas for over 100 years, as a core principle of the original Garden City movement. Today it manages the Green Infrastructure Partnership, a network of over, 2000 members which shares information about the latest green infrastructure policies and project across the UK. The GIP was launched by DEFRA in 2011 and was taken over by the TCPA in April 2014. The TCPA also works on a number of projects on green infrastructure including the EU funded PERFECT project which aims to improve green infrastructure policy across Europe by promoting the multiple benefits that green infrastructure can provide.

== Publications ==
The monthly journal Town & Country Planning publishes a range of reports that highlights the range of their work.
