= Laura Geraldine Lennox =

Irish suffragette (1883–1958)

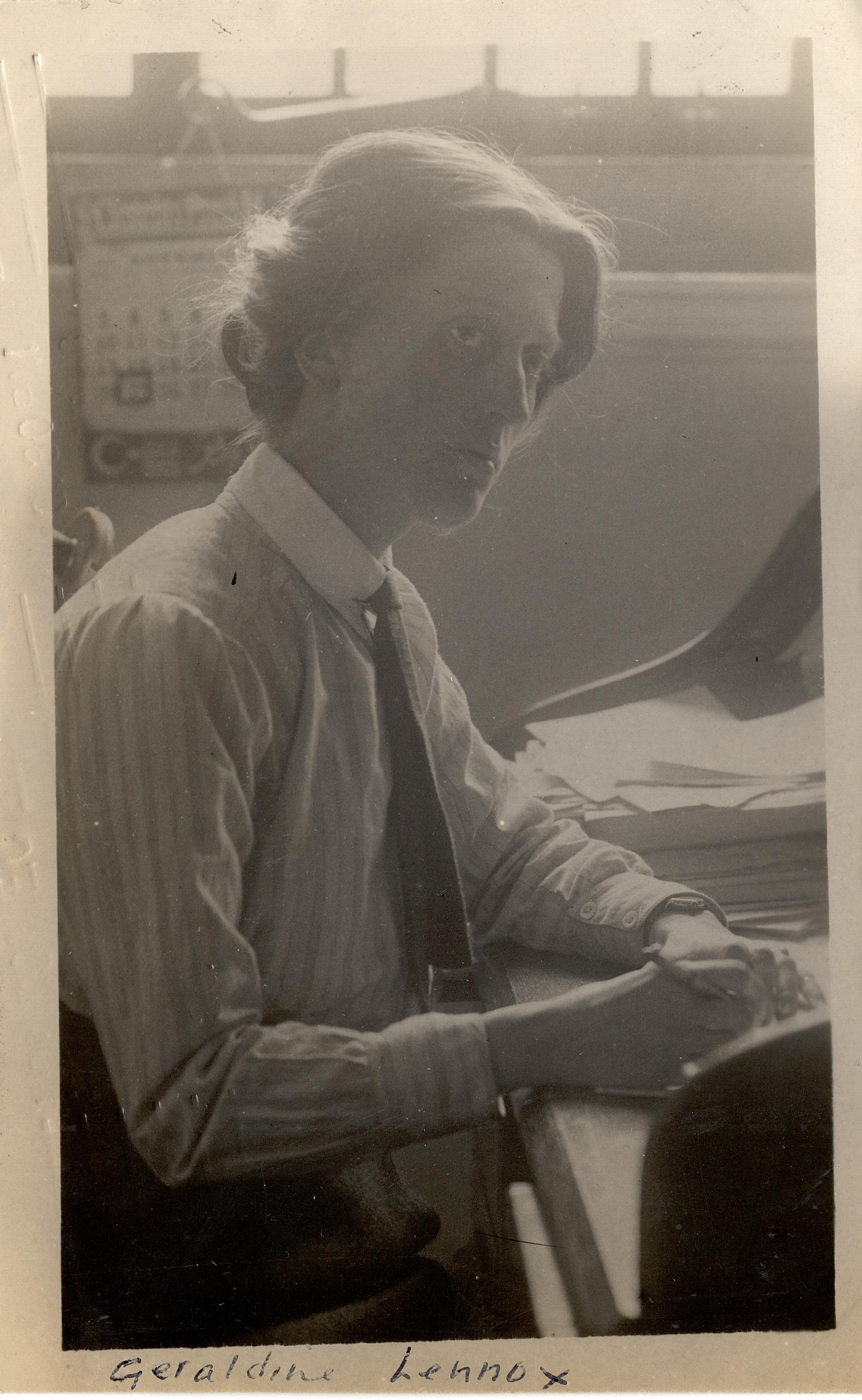
- Geraldine Lennox
- Born: 27 April 1883; Durrus, Cork, Ireland
- Died: 1958 (aged 74–75)

Laura Geraldine Lennox (27 April 1883 – 1958), was an Irish suffragette. She was a volunteer in Paris during the First World War.

== Early life and education ==
Laura Geraldine Lennox was born in Durrus, West Cork on 27 April 1883 to Edward and Adelaide Lennox. She spent some time living in Cork city where she went to school, before she went to London where she became well known as a suffragette.

== Suffrage activity ==
She was one of the 500,000 women who marched in Hyde Park, London on Sunday 21 June 1908 protesting their right to the vote. Lennox was responsible for organising the Irish women involved. By 1910, Lennox was working for the Votes for Women newspaper; she was also involved in the Women's Social and Political Union (WSPU). When Christabel Pankhurst wrote for a newspaper called TheSuffragette in 1912, Lennox was her sub-editor.

Lennox was arrested in April 1913 when the offices of the WSPU were raided. She was sentenced to 6 months in Bristol Prison where she became one of the women who underwent hunger strike. During this time there was a policy to release women when they became extremely ill and once they recovered they were rearrested. Lennox was released and then just week after that she was arrested again and then released after just another four days later. On one such occasion Lennox spotted the police waiting for her and with assistance, she escaped back to Cork.

Lennox was awarded the Holloway brooch and Hunger Strike Medal for her activities. In Cork she founded a local WSPU branch. However the First World War interrupted the suffragette activities.

== World War I ==
Lennox went to France to assist her friends Henry and Agnes Harben who had turned their hotel, the Hotel Majestic, in Paris into a hospital. Her brother was serving in the war and Lennox acted as nurse and administrator in the hotel. Her health was seriously affected during her time there and her brother died during the war. Lennox was awarded the 1914 Star.

== Post war ==
After the war, Lennox returned to London where she set up a typing agency to employ women who had been widowed by the war. She also helped found the Women's Pioneer Housing. Lennox died in 1958.
