= Leon A. Heppel =

American biochemist (1912–2010)

- Born: October 20, 1912; Granger, Utah, United States
- Died: April 9, 2010 (aged 97); Ithaca, New York, United States
- Education: University of California, Berkeley; University of Rochester
- Known for: RNA enzymology Polynucleotide phosphorylase studies Periplasmic enzymes in bacteria
- Awards: National Academy of Sciences (1970); American Academy of Arts and Sciences (1970)
- Scientific career
- Fields: Biochemistry
- Workplaces: Cornell University; National Institutes of Health

Leon A. Heppel (October 20, 1912 – April 9, 2010 (aged 97)) was an American biochemist known for his contributions to the early study of nucleic acid enzymology and bacterial physiology. His research on enzymes involved in RNA metabolism and polynucleotide synthesis helped establish biochemical approaches to the study of nucleic acids. He was a professor of biochemistry at Cornell University and a member of the National Academy of Sciences.

== Early life and education ==
Heppel was born in Granger, Utah. He later moved with his family to San Francisco. Originally intending to pursue chemical engineering, he shifted to biochemistry during his undergraduate studies, and he received his B.S. (1933) and Ph.D. (1937) in biochemistry from the University of California, Berkeley, and his M.D. (1941) from the University of Rochester.

During his early research, he demonstrated that sodium and potassium ions can cross biological membranes.

== Career and research ==
During and following World War II, Heppel conducted research at the National Institutes of Health, where he worked alongside Arthur Kornberg and others on enzymology and nucleotide metabolism.

In the 1950s, his research focused on enzymes involved in the metabolism of ribonucleotides and RNA. During this period, his laboratory attracted a number of investigators entering the emerging field of nucleic acid biochemistry, including Maxine Singer, who joined as a postdoctoral fellow and contributed to studies of polynucleotide phosphorylase before establishing an independent research career. Working with his technician Russell J. Hilmoe, Singer, and others, he studied nucleotidases, phosphodiesterases, and reactions involving ribonucleotides and ATP. His work contributed to the biochemical understanding of RNA structure and enzymatic processing, including studies of polynucleotide phosphorylase and the synthesis and degradation of polyribonucleotides.

Heppel's laboratory played a role in the early development of methods for synthesizing and analyzing polyribonucleotides, which were later used in studies of the genetic code. In particular, enzymatically synthesized RNA polymers from his laboratory were used in experiments that helped establish codon assignments in the famous Nirenberg and Matthaei experiment. His work on enzymatic synthesis and modification of RNA contributed to experimental approaches for studying nucleic acids.

In the early 1960s, Heppel shifted his research focus to bacterial physiology. He demonstrated that a variety of hydrolytic enzymes are localized in the periplasmic space of Gram-negative bacteria and investigated their roles in transport and metabolism. His subsequent work examined amino acid transport systems in Escherichia coli and the function of membrane-associated proteins.

After joining Cornell University in 1967, he continued studies on bacterial membranes and transport processes, as well as later work on the physiological effects of ATP in animal cells.

== Honors and awards ==
Heppel was elected to the National Academy of Sciences and the American Academy of Arts and Sciences in 1970. He received several awards for his contributions to biochemistry, including the Hillebrand Award in 1959, from the Chemical Society of Washington, a division of the American Chemical Society.

== Personal life ==
Heppel was married to Adelaide Keller Heppel for more than 60 years. He had a strong interest in the arts and was known for incorporating art-related questions into his lectures. He died on April 9, 2010, in Ithaca, New York.
