= Gertrude Leverkus =

German-born English architect (1898–1989)

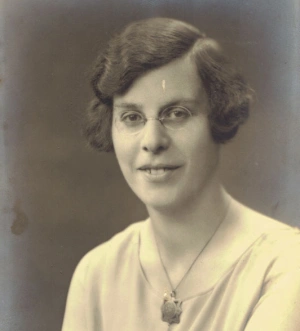
- unknown photographer
- Born: 26 September 1898; Oldenburg, German Empire
- Died: 8 November 1989 (aged 91); Hove, Sussex, England, UK
- Education: University College London
- Occupation: Architect

Gertrude Leverkus (26 September 1898 – 8 November 1989) was a German-British architect.

== Early life and education ==
Gertrude Wilhelmine Margaret Leverkus was born on 26 September 1898 in Oldenburg, Germany. She was the second of three daughters of Ida Christine Rosalia, née Schmidt and Otto Leverkus, an export merchant. Shortly after her birth, her family migrated to Manchester, England, and moved to Forest Hill, London, in 1910.

She attended Sydenham High School and subsequently University College London (UCL). She completed her Bachelor of Arts in architecture from 1916 to 1919 at UCL, and was the only woman among 500 men to take the final exams.

She was articled to Horace Field from 1919 and his assistant from 1922. In that year, with Arthur Stratton and Professor A. E. Richardson, Field proposed her for associate member of the Royal Institute of British Architects (RIBA), making her one of the first three women to do so. She completed a certificate in town planning at UCL in 1925.

== Career ==
In 1923, Leverkus was hired by the Women's Pioneer Housing Limited to convert its properties into flats for women. One of these projects was the conversion of 31 Gledhow Gardens, also known as the Gunter Estate, in Earls Court into flats to house women workers. In 1924 she was officially appointed as WPHL's architect.

In 1930 she moved into a flat she converted from the former ballroom of one Women's Pioneer property, 65 Harrington Gardens in Earl's Court, and remained a tenant of the association until her retirement.

She designed an extension of the Annie McCall Maternity Hospital in Clapham in 1938 to create an outpatients department; the hospital is now a grade II listed building.

In 1928, Leverkus spoke alongside Laura Annie Willson, Ethel Wood, Caroline Haslett and Gladys Burlton at a careers event organised by the Union of Women Voters.

In December 1931, Leverkus was elected a Fellow of RIBA, only the second woman allowed to put the initials FRIBA after her name. The first woman, Gillian Harrison, was only elected earlier that year.

During World War II, Leverkus left private practice to work as an inspector of stately homes to use for the war effort and as an organiser of evacuees from London. From 1943 to 1948, she worked as a housing architect for the West Ham Town Planning Office. From 1948 until her retirement in 1960, she worked for Norman and Dawbarn Architects. During this period, she designed a shopping parade and flats at Swiss Cottage tube station and worked on the new towns in both Crawley and Harlow.

Leverkus was a member of numerous women's groups, and established the women's committee of the RIBA in 1932. She served as the committee Secretary in the 1930s and their work promoted the interests of women architects, encouraged and advised recent graduates as well as recording cases of discrimination. In 1935, Leverkus reported that almost thirty architect firms were "entirely run by women" whilst emphasising the increasing numbers of women architects working in municipal offices. She considered the greatest drawback for women architects at that time to be "the lack of precedent, which makes it an extraordinary thing for a woman to be entrusted with large important work."

Leverkus was also involved in the Women's Provisional Club, alongside other professional women including MP Eleanor Rathbone, engineer Caroline Haslett, Lady Rhondda and Dr Louisa Martindale. She was a member of the Women's Voluntary Service, and the International Federation of Business and Professional Women.

== Later life ==
After retiring from architectural practice in 1960, Leverkus served as governor of the Brixton School of Building. In 1960 she moved to Brighton. She died at 26 Wilbury Villas, Hove, Sussex, on 8 November 1989.
