= Cell-free system =

A cell-free system is an in vitro tool widely used to study biological reactions that happen within cells apart from a full cell system, thus reducing the complex interactions typically found when working in a whole cell. Subcellular fractions can be isolated by ultracentrifugation to provide molecular machinery that can be used in reactions in the absence of many of the other cellular components. Eukaryotic and prokaryotic cell internals have been used for creation of these simplified environments. These systems have enabled cell-free synthetic biology to emerge, providing control over what reaction is being examined, as well as its yield, and lessening the considerations otherwise invoked when working with more sensitive live cells.

== Types ==
Cell-free systems may be divided into two primary classifications: cell extract-based, which remove components from within a whole cell for external use, and purified enzyme-based, which use purified components of the molecules known to be involved in a given process. The cell extract-based type are susceptible to problems like quick degradation of components outside their host, as shown in a study by Kitaoka et al. where a cell-free translation system based on Escherichia coli (E. coli), of the cell extract-based type, had the mRNA template degrade very quickly and led to the halt of protein synthesis.

== Preparation ==
The methods of preparation vary between situations of both types of cell-free systems.

=== Cell extract–based ===
Nobel Prize winner Eduard Buchner was arguably the first to present a cell-free system using yeast extracts, but since then alternative sources have been found. E. coli, wheat germ, and rabbit reticulocytes have all proven useful to create cell-free systems by extraction of their interior components. E. coli 30S extracts have been acquired, for example, by grinding the bacteria with alumina, followed by further cleaning. Similarly, wheat germ has been ground with acid-washed sand or powdered glass to open the cell membranes up. Rabbit reticulocytes have been lysed in a solution of MgCl_{2} and had the extract filtered away from the membranes by centrifugation.

== Uses ==
Cell-free synthetic pathway biotransformation biosystems are proposed as a new low-cost biomanufacturing platform compared to microbial fermentation used for thousands of years. Cell-free biosystems have several advantages suitable in industrial applications:

- Very high product yields are usually accomplished without the formation of by-products or the synthesis of cell mass. For example, with a synthetic enzyme pathway, from the reaction with starch and water

C_{6}H_{10}O_{5} (l) + 7 H_{2}O (l) → 12 H_{2} (g) + 6 CO_{2} (g),
nearly 12 H_{2} has been produced per glucose unit of polysaccharides and water, three times of the theoretical yield of the best anaerobic hydrogen-producing microorganisms.

- In vitro biosystems can implement some biological reactions that living microbes or chemical catalysts cannot implement before. For example, beta-1,4-glucosidic bond linked cellulose can be converted to alpha-1,4-glucosidic bond linked starch by a mixture of intracellular and extracellular enzymes in a single reaction container.
- Enzymatic systems, without the barrier of cellular membrane, usually have faster reaction rates than microbial systems. For instance, enzymatic fuel cells usually have much higher power outputs than microbial fuel cells.
- Enzyme cocktails can tolerate toxic compounds better than microorganisms.
- Enzyme mixtures usually work under broad reaction conditions, such as high temperature, low pH, the presence of organic solvents or ionic liquids.

=== Protein synthesis ===
In vitro biosystems can be easily controlled and accessed without membranes. Notably, in work leading to a Nobel prize the Nirenberg and Matthaei experiment used a cell-free system, of the cell extract-based type, to incorporate chosen amino acids tagged radioactively into synthesized proteins with 30S extracted from E. coli. More recent studies, such as the study done by Spirin et al. with prokaryotic and eukaryotic version of their cell-free translation system, have also synthesized proteins with increased production, incorporating techniques like continuous flow to add materials and remove products. With such advances in yield, productivity applications have been expanded, such as the synthesis of fusion proteins to potentially serve as vaccines for B-cell lymphomas. Additionally, cell-free protein synthesis is becoming a new alternative choice for fast protein synthesis.

=== Metabolic manipulation ===
Engineering of metabolic processes have been achieved through cell-free systems. Bujara et al., for example, were able to use glycolytic network extracts, consisting of enzymes from E. coli that produced dihydroxyacetone phosphate, to analyze in real-time the metabolite concentrations while altering enzyme levels, with the result of optimal production of dihydroxyacetone phosphate. Further, Calhoun and Swartz were able to use a glycolytic intermediate to fuel a cell-free system, enabling relatively inexpensive ATP generation compared to reagent usage in phosphoenolpyruvate reactions.

=== Unnatural amino acid incorporation ===
Cell-free systems have also been used to incorporate unnatural amino acids. Shimizu et al. were able to change a stop codon to a sense codon by omitting the RF1 release factor, indicating ability to insert desired amino acids in unnatural situations. This is of use in systems where working inside a cell is problematic, such as the process of amino acid metabolism preventing specific labelling of amino acids that would be useful in multidimensional NMR spectroscopy. Kigawa et al.were able to successfully label amino acids in a cell-free system where amino acid metabolism was no longer present, thus making such systems useful to NMR studies.
