= Richard Watts-Tobin =

British physicist (1934–2016)

- Born: Richard John Watts-Tobin; March 17, 1934
- Died: April 26, 2016 (aged 82)
- Known for: Co-author of the 1961 paper on the genetic code; contributions to time-dependent Ginzburg–Landau theory
- Scientific career
- Fields: Theoretical physics
- Institutions: MRC Laboratory of Molecular Biology, Lancaster University

Richard John Watts-Tobin (17 March 1934 – 26 April 2016) was a British physicist known for his contributions to the theory of superconductivity and for his co-authorship of a landmark 1961 paper on the genetic code with Francis Crick and Sydney Brenner.

== Scientific contributions ==
Early in his career, Watts-Tobin was a co-author of the influential 1961 Nature paper “General nature of the genetic code for proteins”, which provided key experimental evidence that the genetic code is based on triplets of nucleotides. The work used genetic experiments in T4 bacteriophages to demonstrate that mutations affecting the reading frame supported a triplet coding system. The paper has been described by Charles Yanofsky as a "landmark" study and by Robin Holliday as "a masterpiece of genetic analysis".

Watts-Tobin also co-authored a subsequent 1967 study that extended the genetic analysis of T4 mutations to strains with as many as six frameshifts.

Although trained as a mathematician and physicist, Watts-Tobin worked at the Medical Research Council Laboratory of Molecular Biology during this period, contributing to experiments on mutagenesis and genetic coding alongside Brenner and Crick.

Later in his career, Watts-Tobin returned to his focus on physics, and embarked on studies of theoretical condensed matter physics, particularly superconductivity. His work included studies of thermodynamic properties of type II superconductors using extensions of BCS theory, as well as nonequilibrium phenomena in current-carrying superconducting systems. In this context, he contributed, with Lorenz Kramer, to the development of a generalized form of the Ginzburg–Landau framework, often referred to as the time-dependent Ginzburg–Landau theory, extending it to account for finite inelastic scattering processes and nonequilibrium effects in superconductors. This generalized framework is used in theoretical and computational studies of superconducting dynamics.

== Academic career ==
Watts-Tobin studied mathematics at Trinity College, Cambridge, where he completed a PhD in 1961.

After completing his PhD, Watts-Tobin became a Research Fellow at Selwyn College. He later held a Fellowship and College Lectureship in Mathematics at Churchill College before moving to Lancaster University in 1967, where he served as a lecturer and later senior lecturer in theoretical physics, continuing to publish research until his retirement in 1996. His research focused on the theory of superconductors, and he was noted for his undergraduate teaching.

== Personal life ==
Watts-Tobin was the son of Ethel Watts, one of the first women to qualify as a chartered accountant in the United Kingdom. His father, Oscar Tobin, was a medical doctor.

Watts-Tobin married the physician and Olympic fencer Mary Watts-Tobin in 1963.

Watts-Tobin was an active member of Furness College at Lancaster University and took a particular interest in college life.

He died on 26 April 2016 after a long illness.
