= S. C. Homersham =

Samuel Collett Homersham (ca.1816–1886) born in Kent, England, was an English hydraulic engineer and hydrologist.

He studied rainfall patterns and subterranean water in various parts of England. He also studied impurities in water and effects of softening water supplies. He experimented with various designs of valves for use with water pumps.

Homersham studied the feasibility of atmospheric railways in England.

He joined the British Meteorological Society in 1850, having previously been a member of the Meteorological Society of London which was founded in 1848.

== Family ==
Homersham married Mary Susannah Collen and had ten children.

=== Samuel Collett junior ===
His eldest son, Samuel Collett Homersham (19 July 1855 – 21 January 1892) was an English civil engineer.

Born at Shooter's Hill, Kent, he was educated at King's College School and was employed by James Simpson and Co. of Pimlico for three years, while also studying civil engineering at University College. After a short period in his father's drafting office he went to work from May 1876 to September 1877 as acting Resident Engineer with the Caterham and Redhill Waterworks. He next studied geology and mineralogy at the Royal School of Mines, then from January 1879 assisted his father with various projects, including work for the South Australian Government, until the death of his father in November 1886, when he took over his practice on Buckingham Street, The Strand.

He was elected to the Institution of Civil Engineers in 1881.

He married in 1888 and died suddenly four years later after a severe attack of influenza.

== Sources ==
Institution of Civil Engineers, Minutes of the Proceedings, Volume 109, Issue 1892, 1 January 1892, pp. 421–422 E-ISSN 1753-7843
