= Nirenberg and Matthaei experiment =

1961 scientific experiment instrumental in deciphering the genetic code

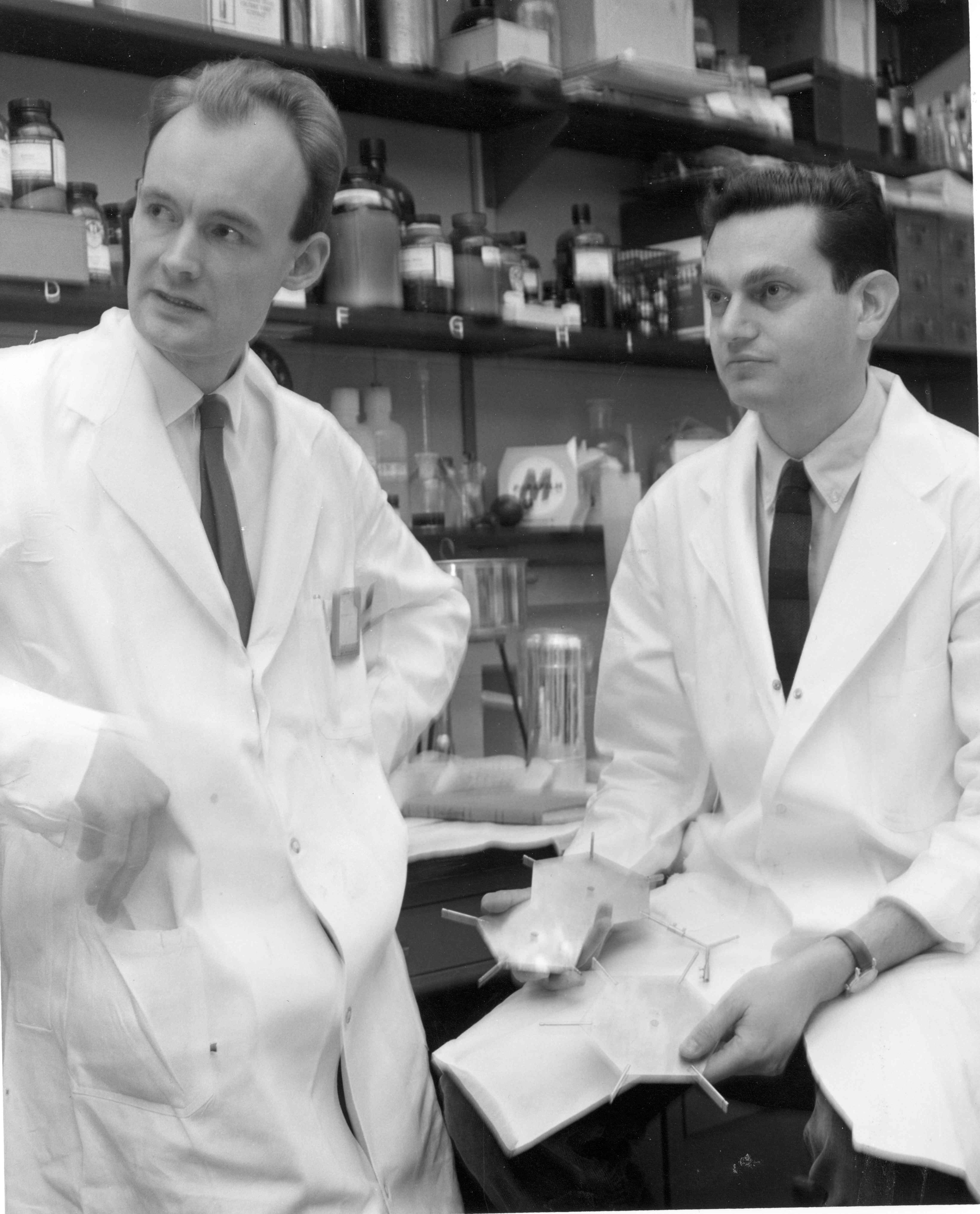
Nirenberg (right) and Matthaei at the National Institutes of Health

The Nirenberg and Matthaei experiment was a scientific experiment performed in May 1961 by Marshall W. Nirenberg and his post-doctoral fellow, J. Heinrich Matthaei, at the National Institutes of Health (NIH). The experiment deciphered the first of the 64 triplet codons in the genetic code by using nucleic acid homopolymers to translate specific amino acids.

In the experiment, an extract was prepared from bacterial cells that could make protein without the presence of intact living cells. An artificial form of RNA consisting entirely of uracil-containing nucleotides (polyuridylic acid or poly-U) was added to the extract, causing it to form a protein composed entirely of the amino acid phenylalanine. This experiment cracked the first codon of the genetic code and showed that RNA controlled the production of specific types of protein.

== Background ==
Discoveries by Frederick Griffith and improved on by Oswald Avery discovered that the substance responsible for producing inheritable change in the disease-causing bacteria (Streptococcus pneumoniae) was neither a protein nor a lipid, rather deoxyribonucleic acid (DNA). In 1944, he and his colleagues Colin MacLeod and Maclyn McCarty suggested that DNA was responsible for transferring genetic information. Later, Erwin Chargaff (1950) discovered that the makeup of DNA differs from one species to another. These experiments helped pave the way for the discovery of the structure of DNA. In 1953, with the help of Maurice Wilkins and Rosalind Franklin's X-ray crystallography, James Watson and Francis Crick proposed DNA is structured as a double helix.

In the 1960s, one main DNA mystery scientists needed to figure out was the number of bases found in each code word, or codon, during transcription. Scientists knew there was a total of four bases (guanine, cytosine, adenine, and thymine). They also knew that were 20 known amino acids. George Gamow suggested that the genetic code was made of three nucleotides per amino acid. He reasoned that because there are 20 amino acids and only four bases, the coding units could not be single (4 combinations) or pairs (only 16 combinations). Rather, he thought triplets (64 possible combinations) were the coding unit of the genetic code. However, he proposed that the triplets were overlapping and non-degenerate (later explained by Crick in his Wobble concept).

Seymour Benzer in the late 1950s had developed an assay using phage mutations which provided the first detailed linearly structured map of a genetic region. Crick felt he could use mutagenesis and genetic recombination phage to further delineate the nature of the genetic code. In the Crick, Brenner et al. experiment, using these phages, the triplet nature of the genetic code was confirmed. They used frameshift mutations and a process called reversions, to add and delete various numbers of nucleotides. When a nucleotide triplet was added or deleted to the DNA sequence the encoded protein was minimally affected. Thus, they concluded that the genetic code is a triplet code because it did not cause a frameshift in the reading frame. They correctly concluded that the code is degenerate (multiple triplets can correspond to a single amino acid) and that each nucleotide sequence is read from a specific starting point.

== Experimental work ==
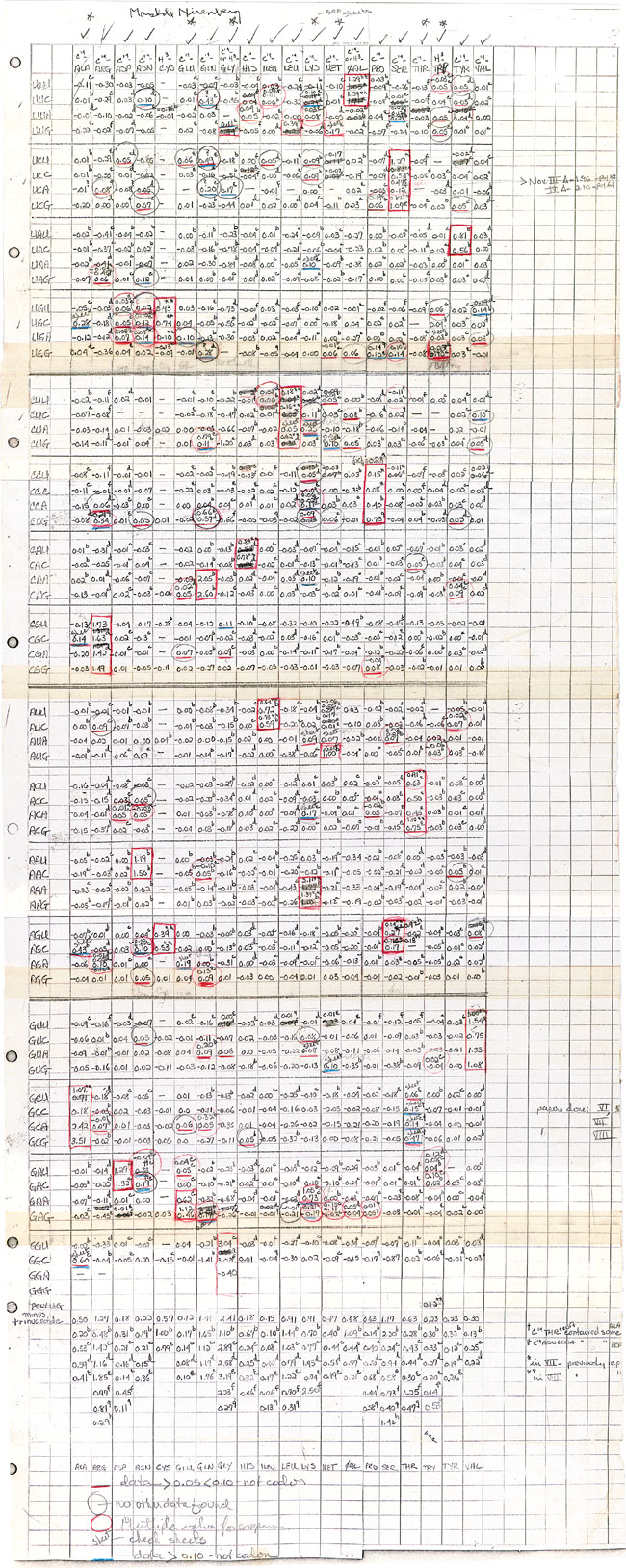
One of Nirenberg's laboratory notebooks

In order to decipher this biological mystery, Nirenberg and Matthaei needed a cell-free system that would build amino acids into proteins. Following the work of Alfred Tissières and after a few failed attempts, they created a stable system by rupturing E. coli bacteria cells and releasing the contents of the cytoplasm. This allowed them to synthesize protein, but only when the correct kind of RNA was added, allowing Nirenberg and Matthaei to control the experiment. They created synthetic RNA molecules outside the bacterium and introduced this RNA to the E. coli system. The experiments used mixtures with all 20 amino acids. For each individual experiment, 19 amino acids were "cold" (nonradioactive), and one was "hot" (radioactively tagged with ^{14}C so they could detect the tagged amino acid later). They varied the "hot" amino acid in each round of the experiment, seeking to determine which amino acids would be incorporated into a protein following the addition of a particular type of synthetic RNA.

The key first experiments were done with poly-U (synthetic RNA composed only of uridine bases, provided by Leon A. Heppel and Maxine Singer). At 3 am on May 27, 1961, Matthaei used phenylalanine as the "hot" amino acid. After an hour, the control tube (no poly-U) showed a background level of 70 counts, whereas the tube with poly-U added showed 38,000 counts per milligram of protein. Subsequent experiments showed that the 19 "cold" amino acids were not necessary and that the protein product had the biochemical characteristics of polyphenylalanine, demonstrating that a chain of repeated uracil bases produced a protein chain made solely of the repeating amino acid phenylalanine. While the experiment did not determine the number of bases per codon, it was consistent with the triplet codon UUU coding for phenylalanine.

In analogous experiments with other synthetic RNAs, they found that poly-C directed synthesis of polyproline. Nirenberg recounts that the labs of Severo Ochoa and James Watson had earlier done similar experiments with poly-A, but failed to detect protein synthesis because polylysine (unlike most proteins) is soluble in trichloroacetic acid. Further, using synthetic RNAs that randomly incorporated two bases at different ratios, they produced proteins containing more than one type of amino acid, from which they could deduce the triplet nature of the genetic code and narrow down the codon possibilities for other amino acids. Nirenberg's group eventually decoded all the amino acid codons by 1966, however this required additional ingenious experimental methods (see Nirenberg and Leder experiment).

== Reception and legacy ==
In August 1961, at the International Congress of Biochemistry in Moscow, Nirenberg presented the poly-U experiments – first to a small group, but then at Francis Crick's urging, again to about a thousand attendees. The work was very enthusiastically received, and Nirenberg became famous overnight. The paper describing the work was published the same month.

The experiment ushered in a furious race to fully crack the genetic code. Nirenberg's main competition was the esteemed biochemist Severo Ochoa. Dr. Ochoa and Dr. Arthur Kornberg shared the 1959 Nobel Prize in Physiology or Medicine for their previous "discovery of the mechanisms in the biological synthesis of ribonucleic acid and deoxyribonucleic acid." However, many colleagues at the National Institutes of Health (NIH) supported Nirenberg, aware that it may lead to the first Nobel Prize by an intramural NIH scientist. DeWitt Stetten Jr., the NIH director who first hired Nirenberg, called this period of collaboration "NIH's finest hour."

Indeed, "for their interpretation of the genetic code and its function in protein synthesis," Marshall W. Nirenberg, Robert W. Holley, and Har Gobind Khorana were awarded the 1968 Nobel Prize in Physiology or Medicine. Working independently, Dr. Holley (Cornell University) had discovered the exact chemical structure of transfer-RNA, and Dr. Khorana (University of Wisconsin in Madison) had mastered the synthesis of nucleic acids. Dr. Nirenberg showed - excluding nonsense codons - every combination of a triplet (i.e. a codon) composed of four different nitrogen-containing bases found in DNA and in RNA produces a specific amino acid.

The New York Times said of Nirenberg's discovery that "the science of biology has reached a new frontier," leading to "a revolution far greater in its potential significance than the atomic or hydrogen bomb." Most of the scientific community saw these experiments as highly important and beneficial. However, there were some who were concerned with the new area of molecular genetics. For example, Arne Tiselius, the 1948 Nobel Laureate in Chemistry, asserted that knowledge of the genetic code could "lead to methods of tampering with life, of creating new diseases, of controlling minds, of influencing heredity, even perhaps in certain desired directions."

In addition to the Nobel Prize, Dr. Nirenberg has received the Molecular Biology Award of the National Academy of Sciences and the Biological Science Award of the Washington Academy of Sciences (1962), the Paul Lewis Award of the American Chemical Society (1963), the Department of Health, Education, and Welfare Medal, along with the Harrison Howe Award of the American Chemical Society of USA, in America (1864).

== See also ==
- Crick, Brenner et al. experiment
- Nirenberg and Leder experiment
