= Marshall Warren Nirenberg =

American biochemist and geneticist (1927–2010)

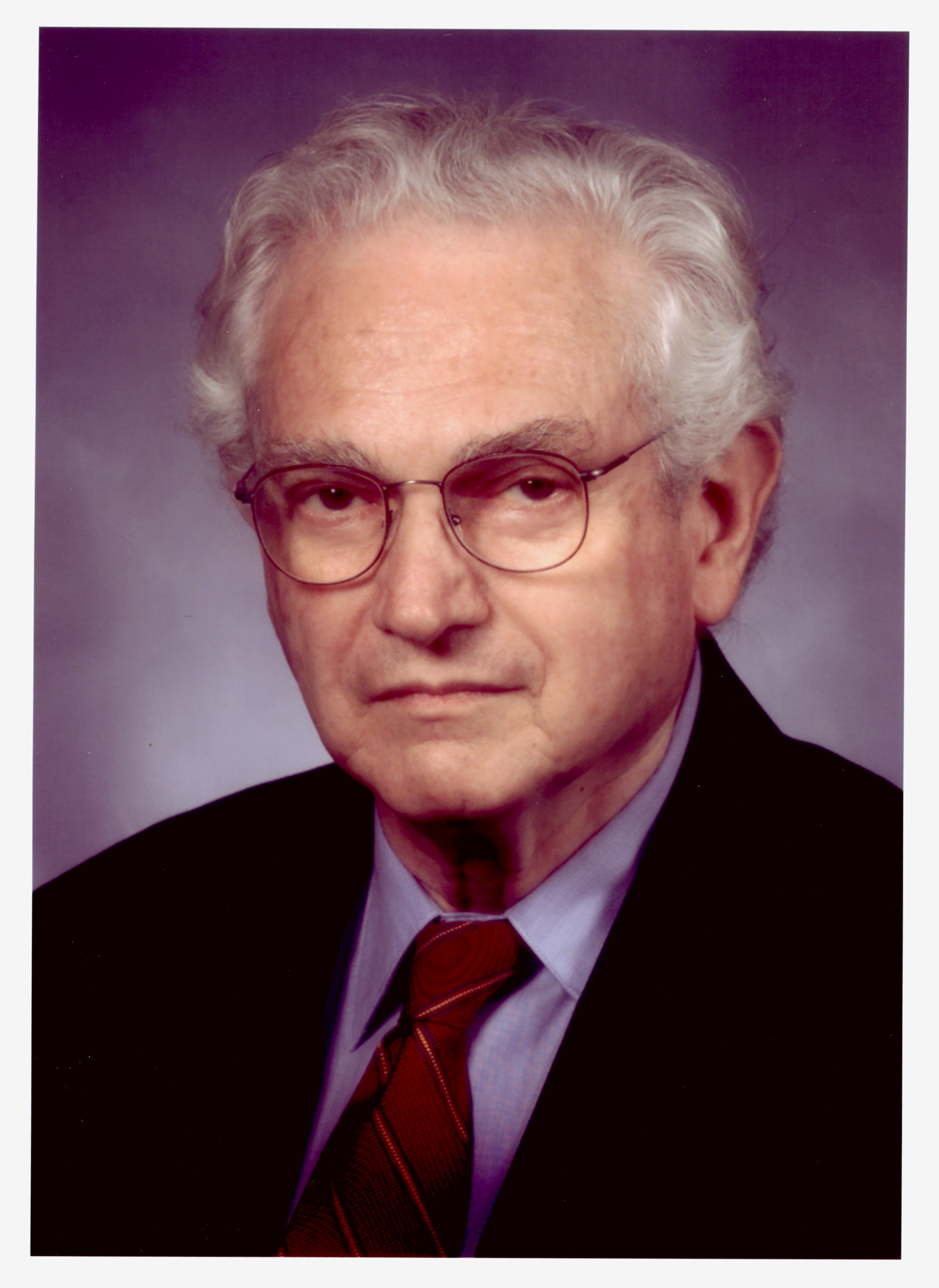
- Nirenberg in 2002
- Born: April 10, 1927; New York City, New York
- Died: January 15, 2010 (aged 82); New York City, New York
- Education: University of Florida (BSc); University of Michigan (PhD)
- Known for: Contribution to solving the genetic code (showing that UUU codes for Phe)
- Spouse(s): Perola Zaltzman-Nirenberg (1961-2001; her death); Myrna M. Weissman (m. 2005-2010; his death)
- Awards: NAS Award in Molecular Biology (1962); National Medal of Science (1964); Pfizer Award in Enzyme Chemistry (1964); Gairdner Foundation International Award (1967); Albert Lasker Award (1968); Nobel Prize in Physiology or Medicine (1968); Franklin Medal (1968); Louisa Gross Horwitz Prize (1968); William H. Nichols Medal (1969)
- Scientific career
- Fields: Biochemistry
- Workplaces: National Institutes of Health
- Doctoral advisor: James F. Hogg

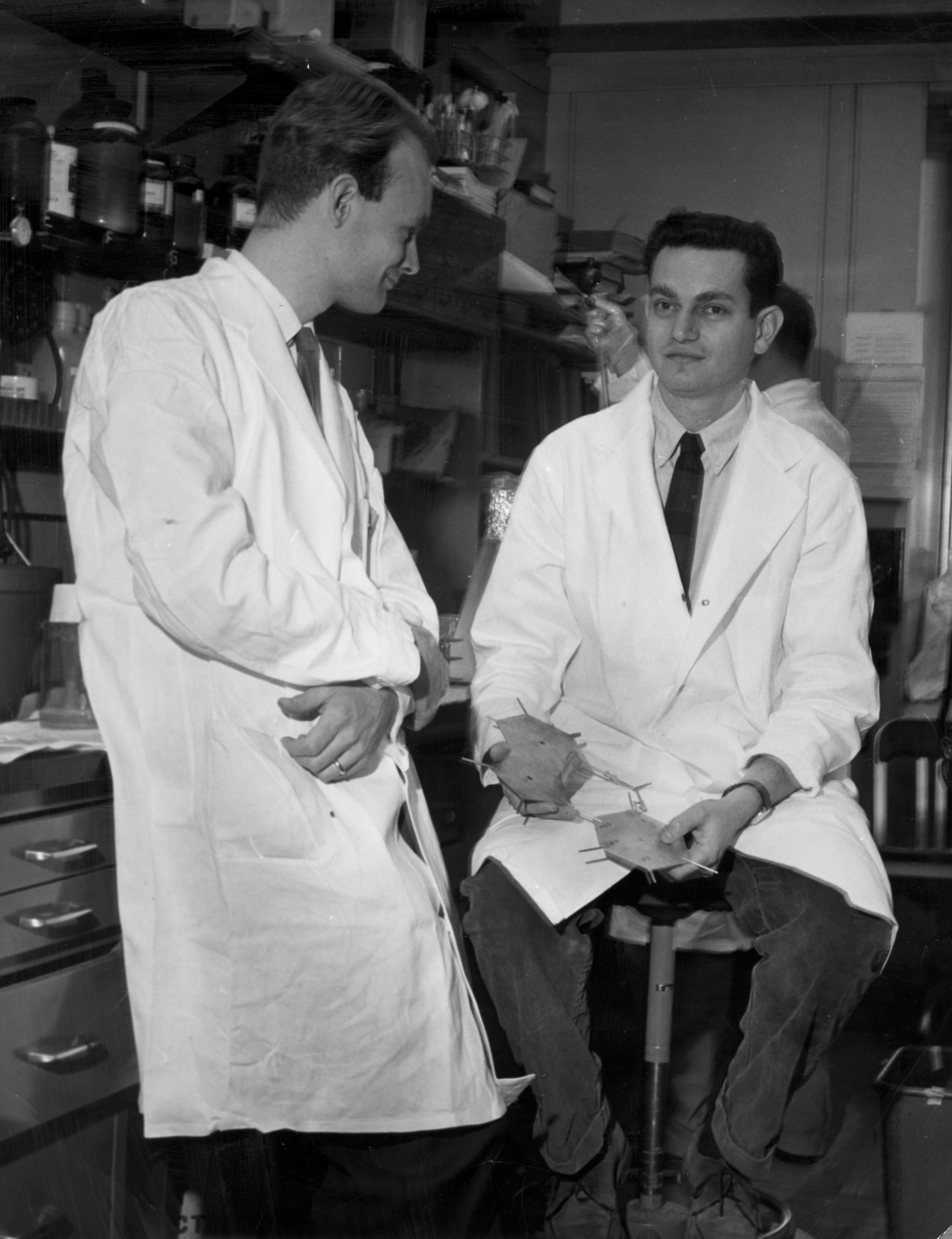
Nirenberg (right) and Matthaei from 1961

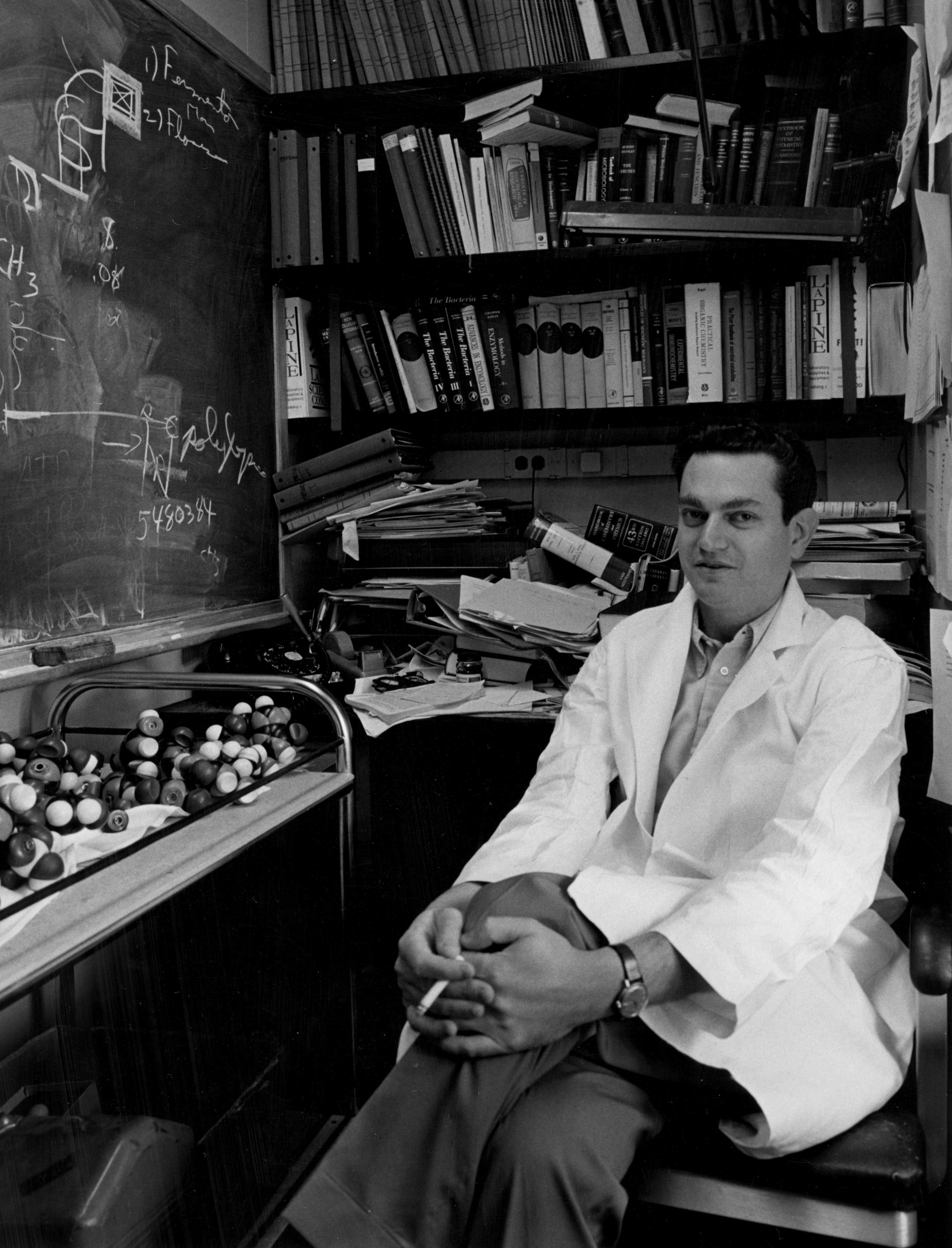
Nirenberg from 1962.

Marshall Warren Nirenberg (April 10, 1927 – January 15, 2010) was an American biochemist and geneticist. He shared a Nobel Prize in Physiology or Medicine in 1968 with Har Gobind Khorana and Robert W. Holley for "breaking the genetic code" and describing how it operates in protein synthesis. In the same year, together with Har Gobind Khorana, he was awarded the Louisa Gross Horwitz Prize from Columbia University.

== Biography ==
Nirenberg was born in New York City to a Jewish family, the son of Minerva (Bykowsky) and Harry Edward Nirenberg, a shirtmaker. He developed rheumatic fever as a boy, so the family moved to Orlando, Florida to take advantage of the subtropical climate. He developed an early interest in biology. In 1948 he received his BS degree, and in 1952, a master's degree in zoology from the University of Florida at Gainesville where he was also a member of the Pi Lambda Phi Fraternity. His dissertation for the Master's thesis was an ecological and taxonomic study of caddis flies (Trichoptera). He received his PhD in biochemistry from the University of Michigan, Ann Arbor in 1957, studying hexose uptake in tumor cells with his advisor James F. Hogg.

He began his postdoctoral work at the National Institutes of Health (NIH) in 1957 as a fellow of the American Cancer Society in what was then called the National Institute of Arthritis and Metabolic Diseases. In 1959 he became a research biochemist at the NIH and began to study the steps that relate DNA, RNA and protein. Nirenberg's groundbreaking experiments advanced him to become the head of the Section of Biochemical Genetics in 1962 in the National Heart Institute (now the National Heart, Lung, and Blood Institute), where he remained a laboratory chief until his death. Fellow laboratory chiefs included Ernst Freese and Daniel Carleton Gajdusek. He was married in 1961 to Perola Zaltzman, a chemist from the University of Brazil, Rio de Janeiro, who also worked at NIH and died in 2001. Nirenberg married Myrna Weissman, PhD, Professor of Epidemiology and Psychiatry at Columbia University College of Physicians and Surgeons in 2005. He had four stepchildren: Susan Weissman of Evanston, Illinois, Judith Weissman of New York, New York, Sharon Weissman of New Haven, Connecticut, and Jonathan Weissman of San Francisco, California. He was also survived by his sister, Joan Nirenberg Geiger of Dallas, Texas, several nieces and a nephew.

Nirenberg was awarded the National Medal of Science in 1964 and the National Medal of Honor in 1968 by President Lyndon B. Johnson. In 1981, Nirenberg became a founding member of the World Cultural Council. In 1986, Nirenberg's achievements and contributions to the field of biochemistry genetics was recognized at an event honoring Maimonides and Menachem M. Schneerson, in the nation's capital, hosted by Bob Dole and Joe Biden. He was elected to the American Philosophical Society in 2001. He died on January 15, 2010, from cancer after several months of illness.

== Research ==
By 1958, experiments and analysis such as the Avery–MacLeod–McCarty experiment, the Hershey–Chase experiment, the Watson–Crick structure and the Meselson–Stahl experiment had shown DNA to be the molecule of genetic information. It was not known, however, how DNA directed the expression of proteins, or what role RNA had in these processes. Nirenberg teamed up with Heinrich J. Matthaei at the National Institutes of Health to answer these questions. They produced RNA composed solely of uracil, a nucleotide that only occurs in RNA. They then added this synthetic poly-uracil RNA into a cell-free extract of Escherichia coli which contained the DNA, RNA, ribosomes and other cellular machinery for protein synthesis. They added DNase, which breaks apart the DNA, so that no additional proteins would be produced other than that from their synthetic RNA. They then added 1 radioactively labeled amino acid, the building blocks of proteins, and 19 unlabeled amino acids to the extract, varying the labeled amino acid in each sample. Only in the extract containing the radioactively labeled phenylalanine, was the resulting protein also radioactive. This implied that the genetic code for phenylalanine on RNA consisted of a repetition of uracil bases. Indeed, as we know now, it is UUU (three uracil bases in a row). This was the first step in deciphering the codons of the genetic code and the first demonstration of messenger RNA (see Nirenberg and Matthaei experiment).

In August 1961, at the International Congress of Biochemistry in Moscow, Nirenberg presented a paper to a small group of scientists, reporting the decoding of the first codon of the genetic code. Matthew Meselson, who was in the audience, spontaneously hugged Nirenberg at the end of the talk and then told Francis Crick about Nirenberg's result. Crick invited Nirenberg to repeat his performance the next day in a talk to a much larger audience. Speaking before the assembled congress of more than a thousand people, Nirenberg electrified the scientific community. He quickly received great scientific attention for these experiments. Within a few years, his research team had performed similar experiments and found that three-base repeats of adenosine (AAA) produced the amino acid lysine, and cytosine repeats (CCC) produced proline. The next breakthrough came when Philip Leder, a postdoctoral researcher in Nirenberg's lab, developed a method for determining the genetic code on pieces of tRNA (see Nirenberg and Leder experiment). This greatly sped up the assignment of three-base codons to amino acids so that 50 codons were identified in this way. Khorana's experiments confirmed these results and completed the genetic code translation.

The period between 1961 and 1962 is often referred to as the "coding race" because of the competition between the labs of Nirenberg at NIH and Nobel laureate Severo Ochoa at New York University Medical School, who had a massive staff. Faced with the possibility of helping the first NIH scientist win a Nobel prize, many NIH scientists put aside their own work to help Nirenberg in deciphering the mRNA codons for amino acids. Dr. DeWitt Stetten, Jr., director of the National Institute of Arthritis and Metabolic Diseases, called this period of collaboration "NIH's finest hour".

Nirenberg's later research focused on neuroscience, neural development, and the homeobox genes.

== See also ==
- History of RNA biology
- List of Jewish Nobel laureates
- List of RNA biologists
- J. Heinrich Matthaei
