= J. Heinrich Matthaei =

German biochemist (1929–2025)

Johannes Heinrich Matthaei
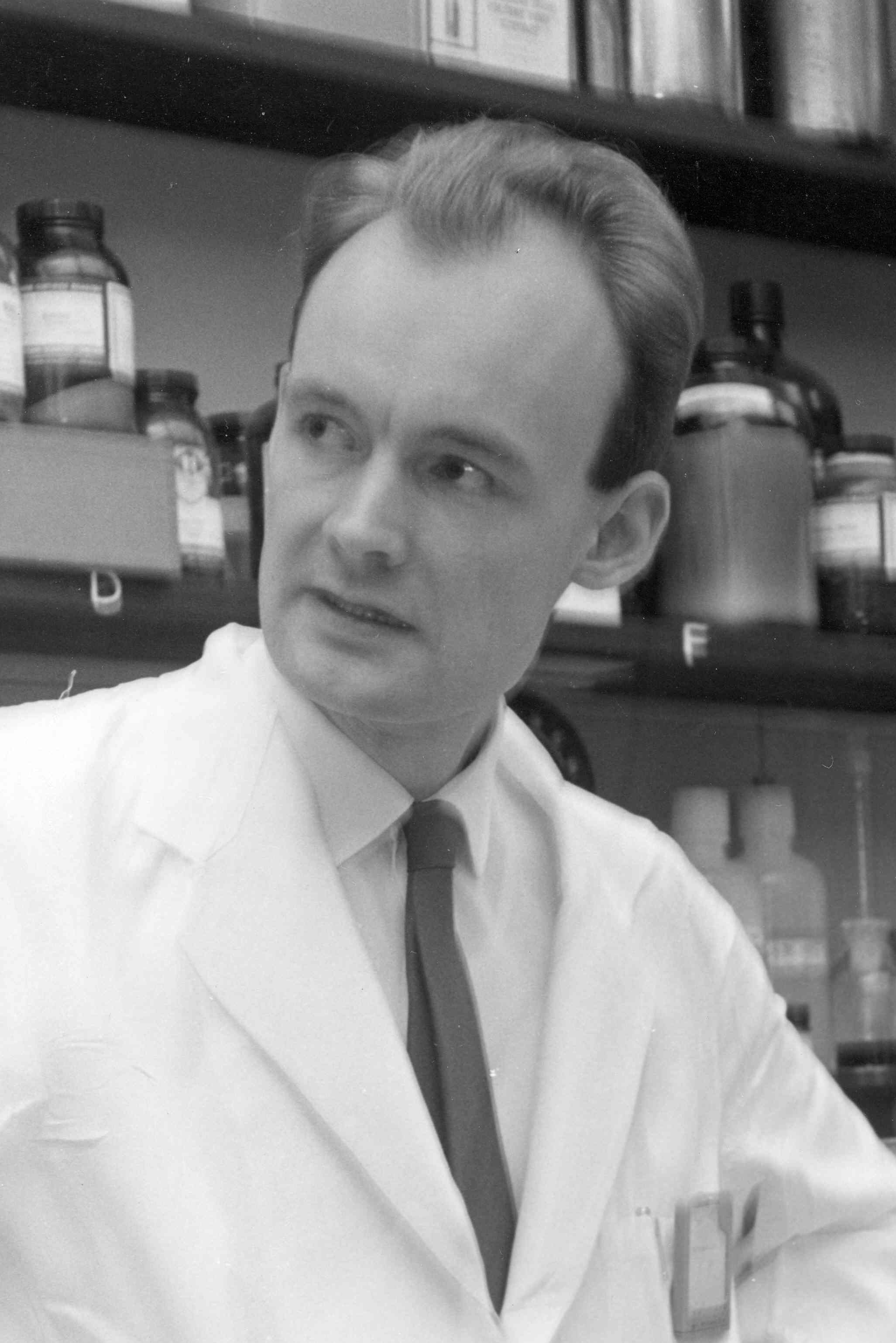
- Matthaei in 1962
- Born: 4 May 1929; Bonn, Rhine Province, Free State of Prussia, Germany
- Died: 7 July 2025 (aged 96); Göttingen, Lower Saxony, Germany
- Citizenship: Germany
- Education: Rheinische Friedrich-Wilhelms-Universität Bonn
- Known for: Contribution to solving the genetic code
- Scientific career
- Fields: Biological chemistry
- Workplaces: Max-Planck-Institut für experimentelle Medizin; National Institutes of Health

Johannes (Johann) Heinrich Matthaei (4 May 1929 – 7 July 2025) was a German biochemist. He is best known for his unique contribution to solving and providing a way to decode the genetic code on 15 May 1961.

== Life and career ==
Whilst a post-doctoral visitor in the laboratory of Marshall Warren Nirenberg at the NIH in Bethesda, Maryland, he discovered that a synthetic RNA polynucleotide, composed of a repeating uridylic acid residue (Uracil), coded for a polypeptide chain encoding just one kind of amino acid, phenylalanine. In scientific terms, he discovered that polyU codes for polyphenylalanine and hence the coding unit for this amino acid is composed of a series of Us or, as we now know the genetic code is read in triplets, the codon for phenylalanine is UUU. This single experiment opened the way to the solution of the genetic code. It was for this and later work on the genetic code for which Nirenberg shared the Nobel Prize for Medicine and Physiology. In addition, Matthaei and his co-workers in the following years published a multitude of results concerning the early understanding of the form and function of the genetic code.

Why Matthaei, who personally deciphered the genetic code, was excluded from this scientific prize is one of the Nobel Prize controversies.

Later, Matthaei was a member of the Max Planck Society in Göttingen as a director. He died on 7 July 2025, at the age of 96.

== Bibliography ==
- Matthaei JH, Nirenberg MW (1961). "Characteristics and stabilization of DNA ase-sensitive protein synthesis in E. coli extracts". Proceedings of the National Academy of Sciences. 47 (10): 1580–1588. Bibcode:1961PNAS...47.1580M. doi:10.1073/pnas.47.10.1580. PMC 223177. PMID 14471391.
- Nirenberg MW, Matthaei JH (1961). "The dependence of cell-free protein synthesis in E. coli upon naturally occurring or synthetic polyribonucleotides". Proceedings of the National Academy of Sciences. 47 (10): 1588–1602. Bibcode:1961PNAS...47.1588N. doi:10.1073/pnas.47.10.1588. PMC 223178. PMID 14479932.

== See also ==
- Rheinische Friedrich-Wilhelms-Universität Bonn
- German inventors and discoverers
- Genetic code
