= Frameshift mutation experiment =

DNA structure discovery

The Crick, Brenner et al. experiment (1961) was a scientific experiment performed by Francis Crick, Sydney Brenner, Leslie Barnett and Richard Watts-Tobin, demonstrated that the genetic code is read in non-overlapping triplets. It was a key experiment in the development of what is now known as molecular biology and led to a publication entitled "The General Nature of the Genetic Code for Proteins".

According to the historian of science Horace Judson, the work is "regarded...as a classic of intellectual clarity, precision and rigour". This study demonstrated that the genetic code is made up of a series of three base pair codons which code for individual amino acids; this "triplet-code" is summarized in DNA and RNA codon tables. The experiment also elucidated the nature of gene expression and frame-shift mutations.

== The experiment ==
In the experiment, proflavin-induced mutations of the T4 bacteriophage gene, rIIB, were isolated. Proflavin causes mutations by inserting itself between DNA bases, typically resulting in insertion or deletion of a single base pair.

Through the use of proflavin, the experimenters were able to insert or delete base pairs into their sequence of interest. When nucleotides were inserted or deleted, the gene would often be nonfunctional. However, if three base pairs were added or deleted, the gene would remain functional. This proved that the genetic code uses a codon of three nucleotide bases that corresponds to an amino acid. The mutants produced by Crick and Brenner that could not produce functional rIIB protein were the results of frameshift mutations, where the triplet code was disrupted.

Crick, Brenner et al. were also able to correct their frameshift mutations through the use of proflavin. If they had a nonfunctional gene due to a deleted base pair, by inserting a base pair into the general area of the deleted one, they were able to rescue the function of the gene. This is because the bases were shifted back into the correct reading frame.

In addition to discovering the triplet nature of the codon, this experiment confirmed the non-overlapping structure of the genetic code, identified the presence of "nonsense coding", and revealed the high degree of degeneracy in codon specification.

== Implications ==
This demonstration of the triplet nature of the genetic code, although carried out with bacteriophage, later proved to be universally applicable to all forms of life.

Decades after its execution, the experiment remains inspiring for scientists, as it is both straightforward yet impactful, and it revealed fundamental insights into the organization and function of DNA and RNA. The results of this experiment inspired many to begin decoding the triplet code discovered by Crick, Brenner et al. Once this paper was published in 1961, researchers knew that there are 64 possible triplet codons, since there are four nitrogenous bases (4 x 4 x 4 = 64). Today, scientists have decoded what all 64 codons encode for, and the assignments have proven to be nearly universal.

== See also ==
- Nirenberg and Leder experiment
- Nirenberg and Matthaei experiment

== Notes ==
- Sydney Brenner (author), Lewis Wolpert (contributor), Errorl C. Friedberg (contributor), Eleanor Lawrence (contributor). 2001. My Life in Science: Sydney Brenner, A Life in Science. Biomed Central Ltd (publisher) ISBN 0954027809 ISBN 978-0954027803
- Horace Freedland Judson (author). 1979. The Eighth Day of Creation. Johnathan Cape (publisher) ISBN 0-224-01722-5
