= Restriction modification system =

Defense system in bacteria and archaea

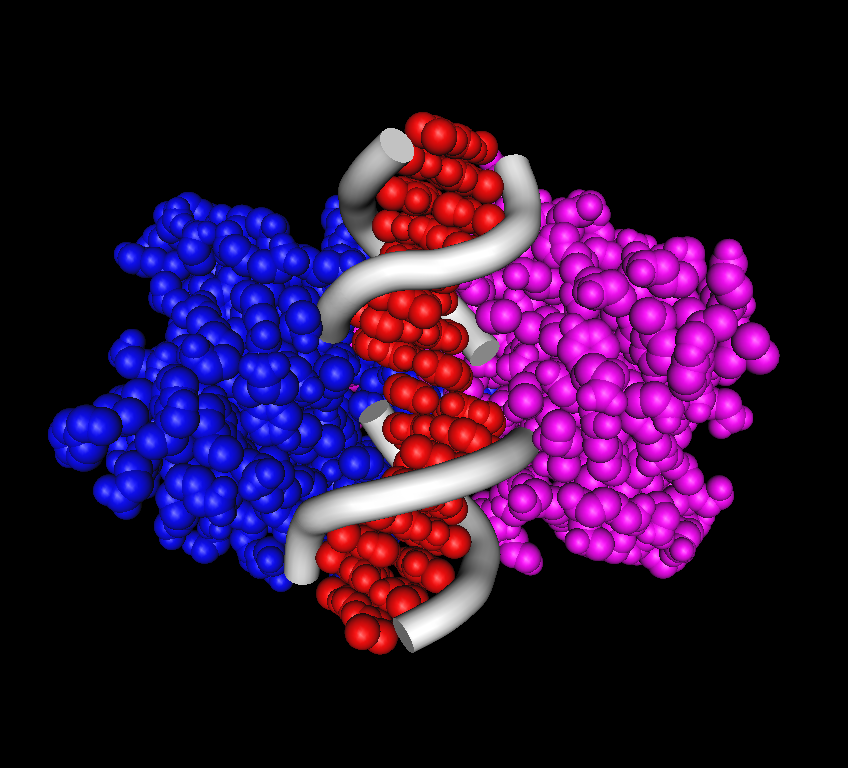
Restriction enzyme EcoRV bound to cleaved DNA substrate

The restriction modification system (RM system) is found in bacteria and archaea, and provides a defense against foreign DNA, such as that borne by bacteriophages.

Bacteria have restriction enzymes, also called restriction endonucleases, which cleave double-stranded DNA at specific points into fragments, which are then degraded further by other endonucleases. This prevents infection by effectively destroying the foreign DNA introduced by an infectious agent (such as a bacteriophage). Approximately one-quarter of known bacteria possess RM systems and of those about one-half have more than one type of system.

As the sequences recognized by the restriction enzymes are very short, the bacterium itself will almost certainly contain some within its genome. In order to prevent destruction of its own DNA by the restriction enzymes, methyl groups are added. These modifications must not interfere with the DNA base-pairing, and therefore, usually only a few specific bases are modified on each strand.

Endonucleases cleave internal/non-terminal phosphodiester bonds. They do so only after recognising specific sequences in DNA which are usually 4–6 base pairs long, and often palindromic.

== History ==
The RM system was first discovered by Salvatore Luria and Mary Human in 1952 and 1953. They found that a bacteriophage growing within an infected bacterium could be modified, so that upon their release and re-infection of a related bacterium the bacteriophage's growth is restricted (inhibited; also described by Luria in his autobiography on pages 45 and 99 in 1984). In 1953, Jean Weigle and Giuseppe Bertani reported similar examples of host-controlled modification using different bacteriophage system. Later work by Daisy Roulland-Dussoix and Werner Arber in 1962 and many other subsequent workers led to the understanding that restriction was due to attack and breakdown of the modified bacteriophage's DNA by specific enzymes of the recipient bacteria. Further work by Hamilton O. Smith isolated HinDII, the first of the class of enzymes now known as restriction enzymes, while Daniel Nathans showed that it can be used for restriction mapping. When these enzymes were isolated in the laboratory they could be used for controlled manipulation of DNA, thus providing the foundation for the development of genetic engineering. Werner Arber, Daniel Nathans, and Hamilton Smith were awarded the Nobel Prize in Physiology or Medicine in 1978 for their work on restriction-modification.

== Types ==
There are four categories of restriction modification systems: type I, type II, type III and type IV. All have restriction enzyme activity and a methylase activity (except for type IV that has no methylase activity). They were named in the order of discovery, although the type II system is the most common.

Type I systems are the most complex, consisting of three polypeptides: R (restriction), M (modification), and S (specificity). The resulting complex can both cleave and methylate DNA. Both reactions require ATP, and cleavage often occurs a considerable distance from the recognition site. The S subunit determines the specificity of both restriction and methylation. Cleavage occurs at variable distances from the recognition sequence, so discrete bands are not easily visualized by gel electrophoresis.

Type II systems are the simplest and the most prevalent. Instead of working as a complex, the methyltransferase and endonuclease are encoded as two separate proteins and act independently (there is no specificity protein). Both proteins recognize the same recognition site, and therefore compete for activity. The methyltransferase acts as a monomer, methylating the duplex one strand at a time. The endonuclease acts as a homodimer, which facilitates the cleavage of both strands. Cleavage occurs at a defined position close to or within the recognition sequence, thus producing discrete fragments during gel electrophoresis. For this reason, Type II systems are used in labs for DNA analysis and gene cloning.

Type III systems have R (res) and M (mod) proteins that form a complex of modification and cleavage. The M protein, however, can methylate on its own. Methylation also only occurs on one strand of the DNA unlike most other known mechanisms. The heterodimer formed by the R and M proteins competes with itself by modifying and restricting the same reaction. This results in incomplete digestion.

Type IV systems are not true RM systems because they only contain a restriction enzyme and not a methylase. Unlike the other types, type IV restriction enzymes recognize and cut only modified DNA.

== Function ==
Neisseria meningitidis has multiple type II restriction endonuclease systems that are employed in natural genetic transformation. Natural genetic transformation is a process by which a recipient bacterial cell can take up DNA from a neighboring donor bacterial cell and integrate this DNA into its genome by recombination. Although early work on restriction modification systems focused on the benefit to bacteria of protecting themselves against invading bacteriophage DNA or other foreign DNA, it is now known that these systems can also be used to restrict DNA introduced by natural transformation from other members of the same, or related species.

In the pathogenic bacterium Neisseria meningitidis (meningococci), competence for transformation is a highly evolved and complex process where multiple proteins at the bacterial surface, in the membranes and in the cytoplasm interact with the incoming transforming DNA. Restriction-modification systems are abundant in the genus Neisseria. N. meningitidis has multiple type II restriction endonuclease systems. The restriction modification systems in N. meningitidis vary in specificity between different clades. This specificity provides an efficient barrier against DNA exchange between clades. Luria, on page 99 of his autobiography, referred to such a restriction behavior as "an extreme instance of unfriendliness." Restriction-modification appears to be a major driver of sexual isolation and speciation in the meningococci. Caugant and Maiden suggested that restriction-modification systems in meningococci may act to allow genetic exchange among very close relatives while reducing (but not completely preventing) genetic exchange among meningococci belonging to different clonal complexes and related species.

RM systems can also act as selfish genetic elements, forcing their maintenance on the cell through postsegregational cell killing.

Some viruses have evolved ways of subverting the restriction modification system, usually by modifying their own DNA, by adding methyl or glycosyl groups to it, thus blocking the restriction enzymes. Other viruses, such as bacteriophages T3 and T7, encode proteins that inhibit the restriction enzymes.

To counteract these viruses, some bacteria have evolved restriction systems which only recognize and cleave modified DNA, but do not act upon the host's unmodified DNA. Some prokaryotes have developed multiple types of restriction modification systems.

R-M systems are more abundant in promiscuous species, wherein they establish preferential paths of genetic exchange within and between lineages with cognate R-M systems. Because the repertoire and/or specificity of R-M systems in bacterial lineages vary quickly, the preferential fluxes of genetic transfer within species are expected to constantly change, producing time-dependent networks of gene transfer.

== Applications ==
=== Molecular biology ===
(a) Cloning: RM systems can be cloned into plasmids and selected because of the resistance provided by the methylation enzyme. Once the plasmid begins to replicate, the methylation enzyme will be produced and methylate the plasmid DNA, protecting it from a specific restriction enzyme.

(b) Restriction fragment length polymorphisms: Restriction enzymes are also used to analyse the composition of DNA in regard to presence or absence of mutations that affect the REase cleavage specificity. When wild-type and mutants are analysed by digestion with different REases, the gel-electrophoretic products vary in length, largely because mutant genes will not be cleaved in a similar pattern as wild-type for presence of mutations that render the REases non-specific to the mutant sequence.

=== Gene therapy ===
The bacteria R-M system has been proposed as a model for devising human anti-viral gene or genomic vaccines and therapies since the RM system serves an innate defense-role in bacteria by restricting tropism of bacteriophages. Research is on REases and ZFN that can cleave the DNA of various human viruses, including HSV-2, high-risk HPVs and HIV-1, with the ultimate goal of inducing target mutagenesis and aberrations of human-infecting viruses. The human genome already contains remnants of retroviral genomes that have been inactivated and harnessed for self-gain. Indeed, the mechanisms for silencing active L1 genomic retroelements by the three prime repair exonuclease 1 (TREX1) and excision repair cross complementing 1 (ERCC) appear to mimic the action of RM-systems in bacteria, and the non-homologous end-joining (NHEJ) that follows the use of ZFN without a repair template.

A major advance is the creation of artificial restriction enzymes created by linking the FokI DNA cleavage domain with an array of DNA binding proteins or zinc finger arrays, denoted now as zinc finger nucleases (ZFN). ZFNs are a powerful tool for host genome editing due to their enhanced sequence specificity. ZFN work in pairs, their dimerization being mediated in-situ through the FoKI domain. Each zinc finger array (ZFA) is capable of recognizing 9–12 base-pairs, making for 18–24 for the pair. A 5–7 bp spacer between the cleavage sites further enhances the specificity of ZFN, making them a safe and more precise tool that can be applied in humans. A recent Phase I clinical trial of ZFN for the targeted abolition of the CCR5 co-receptor for HIV-1 has been undertaken.

== Relation with mobile genetic elements ==
R-M systems are major players in the co-evolutionary interaction between mobile genetic elements (MGEs) and their hosts. Genes encoding R-M systems have been reported to move between prokaryotic genomes within MGEs such as plasmids, prophages, insertion sequences/transposons, integrative conjugative elements (ICEs) and integrons. However, it was recently found that there are relatively few R-M systems in plasmids, some in prophages, and practically none in phages. On the other hand, all these MGEs encode a large number of solitary R-M genes, notably MTases. In light of this, it is likely that R-M mobility may be less dependent on MGEs and more dependent, for example, on the existence of small genomic integration hotspots. It is also possible that R-M systems frequently exploit other mechanisms such as natural transformation, vesicles, nanotubes, gene transfer agents or generalized transduction in order to move between genomes.

== See also ==
- Methylation
- Restriction enzyme
