= Daisy Roulland-Dussoix =

Swiss microbiologist and molecular biologist (1936–2014)

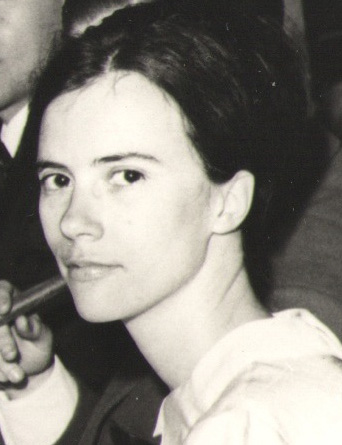
- Born: Daisy Dussoix; 9 September 1936; Geneva, Switzerland
- Died: 5 January 2014 (aged 77); Lancy, Switzerland
- Education: University of Geneva
- Spouse: Daniel Lucien Roulland
- Scientific career
- Fields: Molecular biology
- Workplaces: University of Geneva, Switzerland; Stanford University, United States; University of California San Francisco, United States
- Thesis: Contrôle par la bactérie de l'acceptation d'acide désoxyribonucléique phagique. (Bacterial control over acceptance of phage deoxyribonucleic acid) (1964)
- Doctoral advisor: Werner Arber Eduard Kellenberger

Daisy Roulland-Dussoix (9 September 1936 – 5 January 2014) was a Swiss molecular microbiologist. She was one of the discoverers of restriction enzymes during her doctoral studies. There is controversy over whether she should have received the 1978 Nobel prize in Physiology and Medicine, which was awarded to Hamilton O. Smith, Daniel Nathans, and Werner Arber.

Letters from Daisy Dussoix in 1978 expressing frustration as the influence of her work was not acknowledged by Werner Arber when he received the Nobel prize

== Early life ==
Daisy Roulland-Dussoix was born on 9 September 1936 in Geneva, Switzerland. Her parents were Edmond Louis Dussoix and Elsa Margaetha (Sauerbrey) Dussoix.

== Education ==
Daisy Roulland-Dussoix (née Daisy Dussoix) gained her first degree in Chemistry and Biology from University of Geneva (1958), followed by her doctorate in Biophysics (1964).

== Scientific career ==
She worked for her PhD with Werner Arber and Eduard Kellenberger, Swiss microbial geneticists, at the time when the barriers to infection of bacterial cells by virus (bacteriophage) first became apparent, leading to the discovery of restriction and modification enzymes that have subsequently become essential molecular biology tools. These enzymes result in cleavage of DNA by enzymes at sites characterised by specific sequences unless these are protected by prior enzymatic modification to the DNA bases. This system protects bacterial cells from viral infection.

The research of Grete Kellenberger-Gujer had already demonstrated that phage DNA could be degraded by host bacterial cells. Daisy Dussoix and Werner Arber showed that this process required enzymes, resulting in two publications that paved the way for discovery and isolation of the restriction and modification enzymes involved. They had previously presented these results at the First International Biophysics Congress in Stockholm in 1961.

In 1964 Dussoix moved to Stanford University, USA, funded by a Jane Coffin Childs postdoctoral fellowship to work with Robert Lehman. She subsequently worked as Assistant Professor in Residence in the Department of Microbiology from 1968 at the University of California, San Francisco and continued to study DNA restriction and modification with Herbert W Boyer.

She later worked with the research group of Harold E. Varmus on understanding how avian src family kinase protoncogenes worked. She subsequently moved to the University of California, Berkeley.

In early 1980 Dussoix-Roulland returned to Europe and worked at the Institut Pasteur in Paris on detection of mycoplasmas using PCR-based molecular methods. She was appointed Group Head of the Mycoplasma Laboratory in 1987 in the Viral Oncology Unit of Luc Montagnier. Her publications from these years focused on mycobacterium and mycoplasmas, specifically genetic and molecular characterization and the development of detection methods.

== Contributions, and controversy over recognition of Dussoix's contribution towards Werner Arber Nobel Prize ==
Dussoix-Roulland was a member of the research groups of two future Nobel Prizewinners (Werner Arber (for discovery of restriction enzymes), and the group of Harold Varmus and J. Michael Bishop (for the cellular origin of retroviral oncogenes). Her contribution to these discoveries, and whether she should have had greater recognition, has been a topic of controversy.

Specifically, the work on host-controlled DNA modification and discovery of restriction endonucleases, which earned Arber the Nobel prize in Physiology or Medicine (along with Hamilton Smith and Daniel Nathans), was described in two 1962 articles where Dussoix and Arber were the sole authors.

In a letter to her brother and sister-in-law, written in 1978, shortly after the award of the Nobel prize to Arber, Dussoix-Rolland states that "I am very furious, because apparently he has not even mentioned my name, and I have done half of the work for which he received the Nobel Prize". In Arber's biographical sketch on the Nobel Prize site, it is stated that the findings "that restriction and modification were properties of the bacterial strains and acted not only on infecting bacteriophage DNA, but also on cellular DNA as manifested in conjugation experiments" were reported by himself and Daisy Dussoix for the first time to the scientific community during the First International Biophysics Congress held in Stockholm in the summer of 1961.

Dussoix was not thanked or credited individually as a collaborator directly involved in the work rewarded by the Nobel prize. The text of Arber's Nobel lecture states that together with Grete Kellenberger "Daisy Dussoix, a Ph. D. student, studied the breakdown of DNA from irradiated phage λ upon infection of normal host bacteria".

In a letter to her brother (7 December 1978), Dussoix states: "I have worked with Werner from 1959 to 1963, at which time they (Edouard) forced me to change my PhD thesis project, reportedly because I could not use work done with Werner, but in reality because Werner, after returning from the USA, in order to be paid decently had to engage himself on research on radiation, for which at the time there was more money.

Since Werner was not at all interested in doing the research for which he was paid, somebody had to do it, and that somebody was me, this is why for more than a year before my departure to the USA I was not able to work on restriction, and that should not count for my thesis. In any event, I think that the Nobel Prize was awarded for the two papers published in 62".

== Personal life ==
In 1964 she married Daniel Roulland, chef at The Star in San Francisco. In 1996 she contracted malaria and as a consequence suffered from long-term neurological problems. Following the death of her husband, she returned to Geneva in 2006, where she died in 2014.

== Significant publications ==
- Cultrera, R.; Roulland-Dussoix, D.; Romanit, R.; Contini, C. (1998). "Use of PCR to detect mycoplasma DNA in respiratory tract specimens from adult HIV-positive patients". Journal of Medical Microbiology. 47 (11): 983–986. doi:10.1099/00222615-47-11-983. PMID 9822296.
- Rawadi, G.; Dujeancourt-Henry, A.; Lemercier, B.; Roulland-Dussoix, D. (1998). "Note: Phylogenetic position of rare human mycoplasmas, Mycoplasma faucium, M. buccale, M. primatum and M. spermatophilum, based on 16S rRNA gene sequences". International Journal of Systematic Bacteriology. 48 (1): 305–309. doi:10.1099/00207713-48-1-305. PMID 9542101.
- Rawadi, G.; Lemercler, B.; Roulland-Dussoix, D. (1995). "Application of an arbitrarily-primed polymerase chain reaction to mycoplasma identification and typing within the Mycoplasma mycoides cluster". Journal of Applied Microbiology. 78 (6): 586–592. doi:10.1111/j.1365-2672.1995.tb03103.x. PMID 7615413.
- Rawadi, G.; Jean-Louis Lalanne, J-L.; Roulland-Dussoix, D. (1995). "Cloning and characterization of the lipase operon from Mycoplasma mycoides subspecies mycoides LC". Gene. 158 (1): 107–111. doi:10.1016/0378-1119(95)00160-8. PMID 7789792.
- Roulland-Dussoix, D.; Henry, A.; Lemercier, B. (1994). "Detection of mycoplasmas in cell cultures by PCR: a one year study". Journal of Microbiological Methods. 19 (2): 127–134. doi:10.1016/0167-7012(94)90044-2.
- Dussurget, O.; Roulland-Dussoix, D. (1994). "Rapid, sensitive PCR-based detection of mycoplasmas in simulated samples of animal sera". Appl Environ Microbiol. 60 (3): 953–959. Bibcode:1994ApEnM..60..953D. doi:10.1128/AEM.60.3.953-959.1994. PMC 201416. PMID 8161186.
- Lazraq, R.; Clavel-Seres, S.; David, H.L.; Roulland-Dussoix, D. (1990). "Conjugative transfer of a shuttle plasmid from Escherichia coli to Mycobacterium smegmatis [corrected]". FEMS Microbiol. Lett. 69: 135–138. doi:10.1111/j.1574-6968.1990.tb04189.x.
- Labidi, A.; David, H.L.; Roulland-Dussoix, D. (1985). "Restriction endonuclease mapping and cloning of Mycobacterium fortuitum var. fortuitum plasmid pAL5000". Ann Inst Pasteur Microbiol. 136B (2): 209–215. doi:10.1016/S0769-2609(85)80045-4. PMID 3002238.
- Spector, D.H.; et al. (1978). "Uninfected avian cells contain RNA related to the transforming gene of avian sarcoma viruses". Cell. 13 (2): 371–379. doi:10.1016/0092-8674(78)90205-2. PMID 203404. S2CID 32371355.
- Bulkacz, J.; Roulland-Dussoix, D.; Boyer, H.W. (1975). "Deoxyribonucleic acid modification by intermediate-type modification mutants of Escherichia coli K-12 and B". J Bacteriol. 124 (3): 1395–1402. doi:10.1128/JB.124.3.1395-1402.1975. PMC 236052. PMID 1104586.
- Yoshimori, R.; Roulland-Dussoix, D.; Boyer, H.W. (1972). "R factor-controlled restriction and modification of deoxyribonucleic acid: restriction mutants". J Bacteriol. 112 (3): 1275–1279. doi:10.1128/JB.112.3.1275-1279.1972. PMC 251559. PMID 4565538.
- Boyer, H.; Scibienski, E.; Slocum, H.; Roulland-Dussoix, D. (1971). "The in vitro restriction of the replicative form of W.T. and mutant fd phage DNA". Virology. 46 (3): 703–710. doi:10.1016/0042-6822(71)90072-9. PMID 4944861.
- Roulland-Dussoix, D.; Boyer, H.W. (1969). "The Escherichia coli restriction endonuclease B". Biochim. Biophys. Acta. 195 (1): 219–229. doi:10.1016/0005-2787(69)90618-2. PMID 4901831.
- Boyer, H.W; Roulland-Dussoix, D. (1969). "A complementation analysis of the restriction and modification of DNA in Escherichia coli". J. Mol. Biol. 41 (3): 459–472. doi:10.1016/0022-2836(69)90288-5. PMID 4896022.
- Roulland-Dussoix, D (1967). "Degradation by the host cell of DNA of bacteriophage lambda irradiated by ultraviolet rays". Mutation Research. 4 (3): 241–252. doi:10.1016/0027-5107(67)90019-x. PMID 4860998.
- Dussoix, D.; Arber, W. (1965). "Host specificity of DNA produced by Escherichia coli. IV. Host specificity of infectious DNA from bacteriophage lambda". J. Mol. Biol. 11 (2): 238–246. doi:10.1016/s0022-2836(65)80054-7. PMID 14292250.
- Dussoix, D.; Arber, W. (1962). "Host specificity of DNA produced by Escherichia coli. II. Control over acceptance of DNA from infecting phage lambda". J. Mol. Biol. 5: 37–49. doi:10.1016/s0022-2836(62)80059-x. PMID 13888713.
- Arber, W.; Dussoix, D. (1962). "Host specificity of DNA produced by Escherichia coli. I. Host controlled modification of bacteriophage lambda". J. Mol. Biol. 5: 18–36. doi:10.1016/s0022-2836(62)80058-8. PMID 13862047.
