= Jean Weigle =

Swiss biologist (1901–1968)

- Born: Jean-Jacques Weigle; 9 July 1901; Geneva, Switzerland
- Died: 28 December 1968 (aged 67); Pasadena, California
- Education: University of Geneva (Ph.D.)
- Known for: Contributions to bacteriophage λ research
- Spouse: Ruth Juliette Falk
- Scientific career
- Fields: Physics, biology
- Institutions: University of Pittsburgh, University of Geneva, Caltech

Jean-Jacques Weigle (9 July 1901 – 28 December 1968) was a Swiss molecular biologist at Caltech and formerly a physicist at the University of Geneva from 1931 to 1948. He is known for his major contributions on field of bacteriophage λ research, focused on the interactions between those viruses and their E. coli hosts.

== Biography ==
Jean Weigle was born in Geneva, Switzerland, where he obtained his PhD in physics in 1923, from the University of Geneva. He married Ruth Juliette Falk, a widow. He died in Pasadena, California, after suffering a heart attack in 1968.

== Research ==
As a physicist he was noted for his research on x-ray diffraction to the study of crystal structure; the effects of temperature on this diffraction; the diffraction of light by ultrasonics. He was working as professor of Physics at the University of Pittsburgh in the 1920s. At the University of Geneva he became director of the Institute of Physics in 1931. He developed the first electron microscope made in Switzerland, an important factor for the studies of molecular biology leading to creation in 1964 of the Institute of Molecular Biology (MOLBIO) in Geneva by Eduard Kellenberger and others.

After suffering his first heart attack in 1946 he emigrated to the US in 1948, resigned from the faculty of the University of Geneva and went to Caltech in Pasadena, California. There he turned to biology and worked in the Phage group of Max Delbrück, Seymour Benzer, Elie Wollman, and Gunther Stent. While at Caltech, Weigle worked with other notable molecular biologists, including George Streisinger (whom Weigle mentored as a postdoctoral researcher), Giuseppe Bertani, and Nobel laureate Werner Arber.

In 1952, Salvador Luria had discovered the phenomenon of "restriction modification" (the modification of phage growing within an infected bacterium, so that upon their release and re-infection of a related bacterium the phage's growth is restricted), (also described in Luria's autobiography, pgs. 45 and 99). Work by Jean Weigle and Giuseppe Bertani at almost the same time, and later work by others clarified the basis for this phenomenon. They showed that restriction was actually due to attack by specific bacterial enzymes on the modified phage's DNA. This work led to the discovery of the class of enzymes now known as "restriction enzymes." These enzymes allowed controlled manipulation of DNA in the laboratory, thus providing the foundation for the development of genetic engineering.

He is most noted for his demonstration, with Matthew Meselson, of Caltech and Grete Kellenberger of Geneva, that genetic recombination involves actual breakage and reunion of DNA molecules. He created the classic induction of a lysogen, which involved irradiating the infected cells with ultraviolet light. He demonstrated through his classical experiments the inducible nature of the DNA repair system.

The induction of DNA damage-response genes in bacteria has come to be known as the SOS response. This response includes DNA damage inducible mutagenesis (now referred to as Weigle mutagenesis in his honor) and inducible DNA repair following DNA damage (termed Weigle reactivation).

== Selected works ==
- Weigle, J. J.; Delbrück, M. (1951). "Mutual exclusion between an infecting phage and a carried phage". J. Bacteriol. 62 (3): 301–318. doi:10.1128/jb.62.3.301-318.1951. PMC 386128. PMID 14888647.
- Weigle, J. J. (1953). "Induction of Mutations in a Bacterial Virus". Proc Natl Acad Sci USA. 39 (7): 628–636. Bibcode:1953PNAS...39..628W. doi:10.1073/pnas.39.7.628. PMC 1063835. PMID 16589315.

== Awards and honours ==
In 1947 he received an honorary doctorate from Case Institute of Technology. In 1962 he was awarded the Prix des trois physiciens.

== Legacy ==
"So Weigle was the pioneer of the whole lambda genetics business, which is now a real industrial operation". "The interest of physical scientists such Max Delbrück and Jean Weigle in the 20th Century had a revolutionizing effect on biology". In his honor the institutions where he worked created the Weigle Memorial Service and the Weigle Memorial Lecture at Caltech, and several friends established the Jean Weigle Memorial Fund. The Weigle lecture honors his memory, since he was instrumental for the development of Molecular Biology in Geneva.
