= Nathans =

Nathans may refer to:

- Nathan's Famous, a restaurant chain
- Daniel Nathans, an American microbiologist
