= Community Cyberinfrastructure for Advanced Microbial Ecology Research and Analysis =

CAMERA

Content
- Description: Community Cyberinfrastructure for Advanced Microbial Ecology Research and Analysis

Contact
- Research center: University of California, San Diego
- Laboratory: Center for Research on Biological Systems and Calit2
- Primary citation: PMID 21045053
- Release date: 2007

Access
- Website: camera.calit2.net

CAMERA, or the Community Cyberinfrastructure for Advanced Microbial Ecology Research and Analysis, is an online cloud computing service that provides hosted software tools and a high-performance computing infrastructure for the analysis of metagenomic data. The project was announced in January 2006, becoming Calit2's flagship project.

== Mission ==
The project aims to accelerate genomic research by amassing a large repository of metagenomic data generated by independent members of the research community at large, by developing a custom bioinformatics toolset optimized for cluster computing, and by offering the high-performance computing infrastructure on which to run it.

CAMERA helps scientists access and work with data from the Venter Institute's Global Ocean Sampling Expedition. In 2007, their GOS dataset was the largest ever released in the public domain. The group also places many other datasets for download on its website.

The project is funded by the Gordon and Betty Moore Foundation which awarded a 7-year, $24.5-million research grant to the CAMERA project, beginning in January 2006.

== History ==
At its inception, CAMERA's mission focused on genomic research of marine microorganisms. CAMERA later expanded its mission to include terrestrial ecology and dropped the word, "Marine" from its original name, the "Community Cyberinfrastructure for Advanced Marine Microbial Ecology Research and Analysis".

== People ==
CAMERA's leadership includes:

- Principal Investigator Larry Smarr (UCSD)
- Executive Director Paul Gilna (UCSD)

== See also ==
- Bioinformatics
- Metagenomics
- Microbial ecology
