= Synthetic mycoides =

Artificial life form created at the J. Craig Venter Institute

Synthetic mycoides refers to an artificial life form created by Craig Venter at the J Craig Venter Institute in May 2010. A synthetic genome was transferred into an empty cell to form the bacterium, which was capable of self replication and functioned solely from the transferred chromosomes.
