= Juan Enríquez Cabot =

Mexican-American academic and businessman

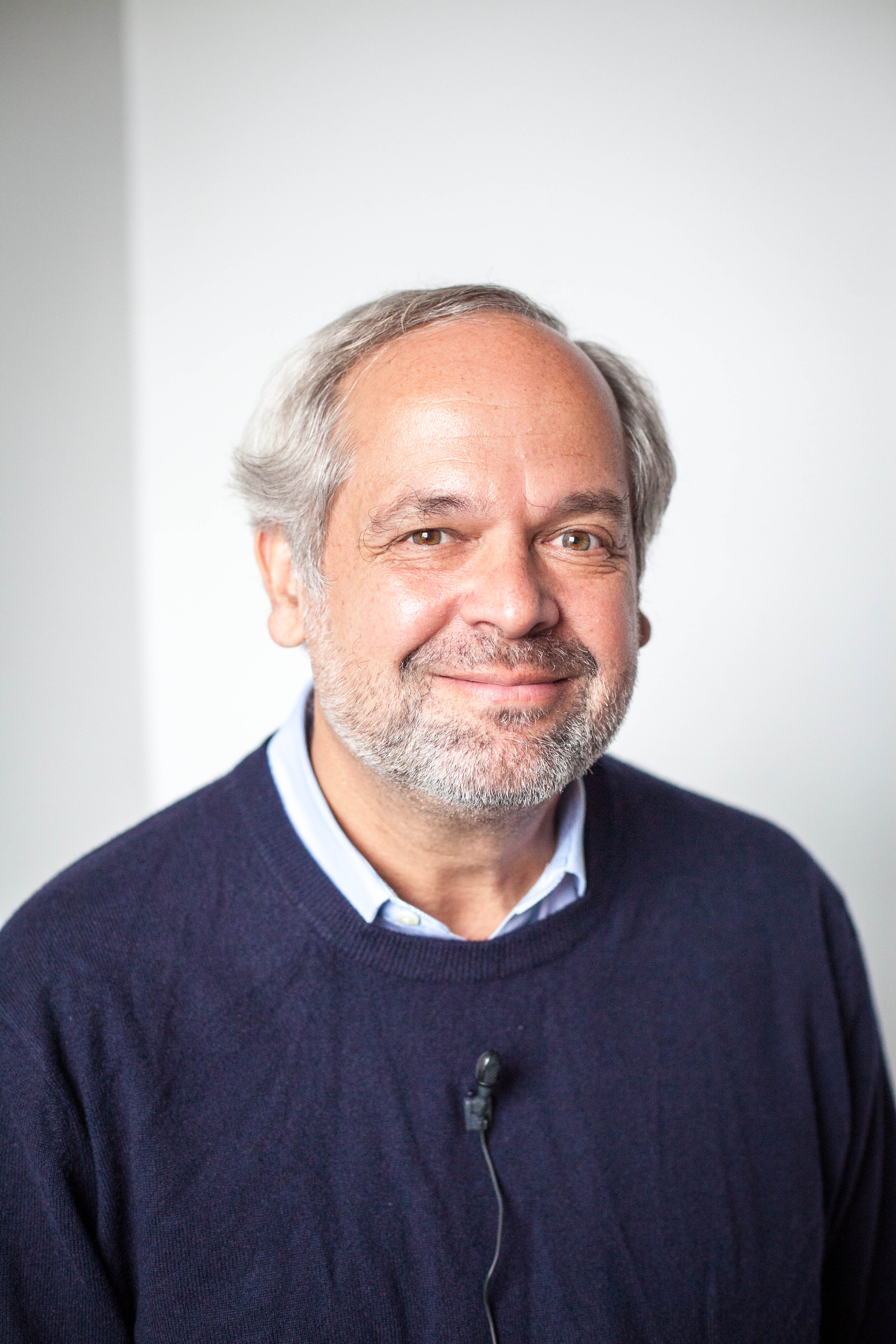
Portrait of Juan Enríquez Cabot at PopTech 2012

Juan Enríquez Cabot (born 1959) is a Mexican-American academic, businessman, author, and speaker. He is currently the managing director of Excel Venture Management.

== Biography ==
Enríquez is the son of Antonio Enríquez Savignac and Marjorie Cabot Lewis of the Boston Cabot family. He is a graduate of Phillips Academy Andover (1977) and Harvard, where he earned a B.A. (1981) and an MBA (1986), with honors.

== Academic research ==
He was the Founding Director of the Life Sciences Project at Harvard Business School (HBS), a fellow of Harvard's Center for International Affairs and an Affiliate at MIT's Synthetic Neurobiology Lab. His work has been published in the Harvard Business Review, Foreign Policy, Science, and The New York Times. He is the author of many books, including Right/Wrong: How Technology Transforms Our Ethics (MIT Press, 2020), Evolving Ourselves: How Unnatural Selection and Nonrandom Mutation are Changing Life on Earth (Current-Penguin Group, 2015), Homo Evolutis: Please Meet the Next Human Species (TED, 2012), As the Future Catches You: How Genomics & Other Forces are Changing Your Life, Work, Health & Wealth (Crown Business, 2005), and The Untied States of America: Polarization, Fracturing, and Our Future (Random House, 2005). He works in business, science, and domestic/international politics.

Enríquez is recognized as a leading authority on the economic and political impacts of the life sciences. He is currently chairman and CEO of Biotechonomy LLC, a life sciences research and investment firm, and Managing Director at Excel Venture Management.

He has written several articles, including "Transforming Life, Transforming Business: the Life Science Revolution," which was co-authored with Ray Goldberg and which received a McKinsey Prize in 2000 (2nd place). Enríquez also co-authored the first map of global nucleotide data flow, as well as HBS's working papers on "Life Sciences in Arabic Speaking Countries," "Global Life Science Data Flows and the IT industry," "SARS, Smallpox, and Business Unusual," and "Technology, Gene Research and National Competitiveness." Harvard Business School Interactive picked Enríquez as one of the best teachers at the school, and showcased his work in its first set of faculty products.

The Harvard Business Review showcased his ideas as one of the breakthrough concepts in its first HBR List. Fortune profiled him as "Mr. Gene." The Van Heyst Group asked him to co-organize the life sciences summit commemorating the fiftieth anniversary of the discovery of DNA. The summit "The Future of Life" was sponsored by Time. Seed picked his ideas as one of fifty that "shaped our identity, our culture, and the world as we know it".

== Business ventures ==
Enríquez has served on a variety of boards including: Cabot Corporation, Zipongo, NeoSensory, Synthetic Genomics, Open Water, the Harvard Medical School Genetics Advisory Council, the Chairman's International Council of the Americas Society, the Visiting Committee of Harvard's David Rockefeller Center, Tufts University's EPIIC, TED's Brain Trust, Harvard Business School's PAPSAC, WGBH, and the Museum of Science (Boston).

Enríquez joined a multi-stage world sailing discovery voyage led by J. Craig Venter, who sequenced the human genome. The expedition voyage sampled microbial genomes throughout the world's oceans. This expedition involved a number of institutions and top scholars including The Institute for Genomic Research, Woods Hole Oceanographic Institution, The Explorers Club, and Prof. E. O. Wilson. It also led to the discovery of a great number of new species.

Enríquez served as CEO of Mexico City's Urban Development Corporation, coordinator general of economic policy and chief of staff for Mexico's secretary of state, and as a member of the peace commission that negotiated the cease-fire in Chiapas' Zapatista rebellion.
