= Claire M. Fraser =

American genome scientist and microbiologist

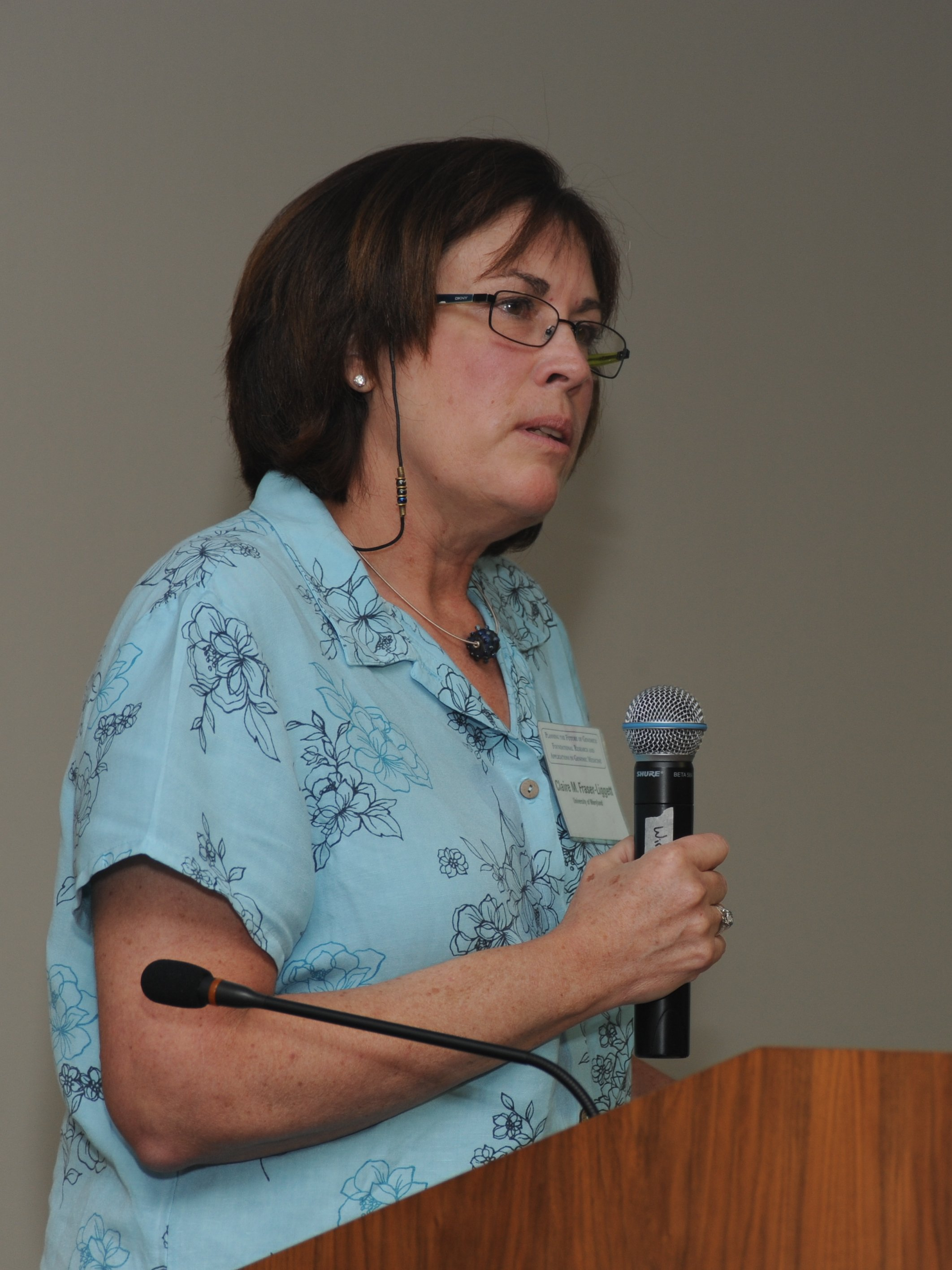
- Fraser in 2010
- Born: November 5, 1955 (age 70)
- Education: Rensselaer Polytechnic Institute; State University of New York at Buffalo
- Spouses: J. Craig Venter; Jack Kammer (m. 2013)
- Awards: Ernest Orlando Lawrence Award; Promega Biotechnology Award; Charles Thom Award
- Scientific career
- Fields: Genomics; Microbiology
- Workplaces: University of Maryland, Baltimore
- Thesis: Autoantibodies and monoclonal antibodies to ℓgbℓs-adrenergic receptors : their role in receptor characterization and human physiology (1981)

Claire M. Fraser (born November 5, 1955) is an American genome scientist and microbiologist who has worked in microbial genomics and genome medicine. Her research has contributed to the understanding of the diversity and evolution of microbial life. Fraser is the director of the Institute for Genome Sciences at the University of Maryland School of Medicine in Baltimore, MD, where she holds the Dean's Endowed Professorship in the School of Medicine. She has joint faculty appointments at the University of Maryland School of Medicine in the Departments of Medicine and Microbiology/Immunology. In 2019, she began serving a one-year term as President-Elect for the American Association for the Advancement of Science (AAAS), which will be followed by a one-year term as AAAS president starting in February 2020 and a one-year term as chair of the Board of Directors in February 2021.

== Early life ==
Claire M. Fraser was born on November 5, 1955, in Boston, Massachusetts. Fraser was raised by a high school principal and an elementary school teacher in Saugus, MA a suburb of Boston, MA. She performed well at school and was always interested in learning. She became interested in science after being taught biology in high school. At Rensselaer Polytechnic Institute (RPI), during her senior year, she performed independent research in a research lab.

== Education ==
Fraser received her B.S. degree in Biology from Rensselaer Polytechnic Institute in 1977 and her Ph.D. degree in Pharmacology at the State University of New York at Buffalo in 1981 with a thesis entitled "Autoantibodies and monoclonal antibodies to beta-adrenergic receptors : their role in receptor characterization and human physiology".

== Career ==
Fraser has authored more than 300 publications with more than 50,000 citations, edited four books, and served on the editorial boards of nine scientific journals. She is included on 23 issued patents and 19 published patents

=== Genomics ===
From 1998 to 2007, Fraser was president and director of The Institute for Genomic Research (TIGR) in Rockville, MD, and led the teams that sequenced the genomes of bacterial and parasitic pathogens and the first model plant, Arabidopsis thaliana. In 1995, Fraser was part of the team to first sequence the complete genome of a free-living organism—Haemophilus influenzae—the bacterium that causes lower respiratory tract infections and meningitis in infants and young children. In 2007, Fraser joined the University of Maryland School of Medicine as director of the new Institute for Genome Sciences.

Fraser's work on the 2001 Amerithrax investigation led to the identification of four genetic mutations in the anthrax spores that enabled the FBI to trace the material back to its original source. This effort catalyzed the development of the field of microbial forensics. She is an expert in microbial forensics and the growing concern about dual uses – research that can provide knowledge and technologies that could be misapplied.

Fraser has led NIAID-funded efforts in the genomics of infectious disease, including the current iteration of the Genome Centers for Infectious Disease. Past and current studies funded through these initiatives aim to explore the dynamic interactions between high-priority pathogens, hosts, their microbiota, the immune system, and the environment, with the goal to provide a comprehensive understanding of the determinants of infectious disease with hypothesis-driven research using high-throughput "-omics" technologies. These projects both stimulate and enhance ongoing technology development in technology and data cores.

Fraser's current research is part of the Human Microbiome Project and is focused on how the structure and function of microbial communities in the human gastrointestinal tract change in association with diseases such as obesity and inflammatory bowel disease, and how these communities respond to interventions including oral vaccination and probiotics administration.

=== Advisory panels and editorial boards ===
In 2019, Fraser is serving a one-year term as President-Elect for the American Association for the Advancement of Science (AAAS), which will be followed by a one-year term as AAAS president starting in February 2020 and a one-year term as chair of the Board of Directors in February 2021. In accepting the nomination to be a candidate for AAAS President, Fraser expressed a desire to use this position to be an ardent spokesperson for science and to promote application of the scientific method to the solution of our most pressing problems, including climate change, antimicrobial resistance as well as food security, water security, and energy security. She notes that "our ability to respond to these challenges has been hampered to a considerable extent by a lack of adequate funding, a tendency to fund 'safer' research projects, and a relative lack of public trust in science.".

Fraser has been an editor for journals mBio, Journal of Bacteriology, Microbial Genomics (journal), Molecular Case Studies, and DNA and Cell Biology. Since 2006, Fraser has also served as a member of the Board of Directors of Becton, Dickinson and Company (BD), a Fortune 500 medical technology company.

== Awards and nominations ==
- 2002 Ernest Orlando Lawrence Award
- 2004 AAAS Fellow, American Association for the Advancement of Science
- 2005 Promega Biotechnology Award, the American Society for Microbiology
- 2006 Charles Thom Award Society for Industrial Microbiology
- 2010 Maryland Women's Hall of Fame
- 2010 Greater Baltimore Council's Leadership in Bioscience Award
- 2010 Women in Technology – Health IT Award
- 2011 Rensselaer Alumni Hall of Fame
- 2011 Elected into the Institute of Medicine of the National Academies
- 2013 Influential Marylander's Award, Daily Record
- 2014 Maryland International Business Leadership Award
- 2014 Thomson Reuter's The World's Most Influential Scientific Minds, Microbiology
- 2015 Dean's Endowed Professor in the School of Medicine

== Personal life ==
Fraser was previously married to Craig Venter. Since 2013, she has been married to Jack Kammer, an author who examines gender issues from a male point of view. Fraser has owned several standard poodles, including Shadow whose genome was sequenced.
