= Juan Enríquez =

Juan Enríquez may refer to:

- Juan Enríquez (bishop) (died 1418), Castilian Franciscan bishop of Lugo
- Juan Enríquez de Borja y Almansa (1619–1675), Spanish nobleman
- Juan Enríquez Cabot (born 1959), Mexican-American businessman
- Juan Enríquez (footballer) (born 1990), Mexican footballer
