= George Streisinger =

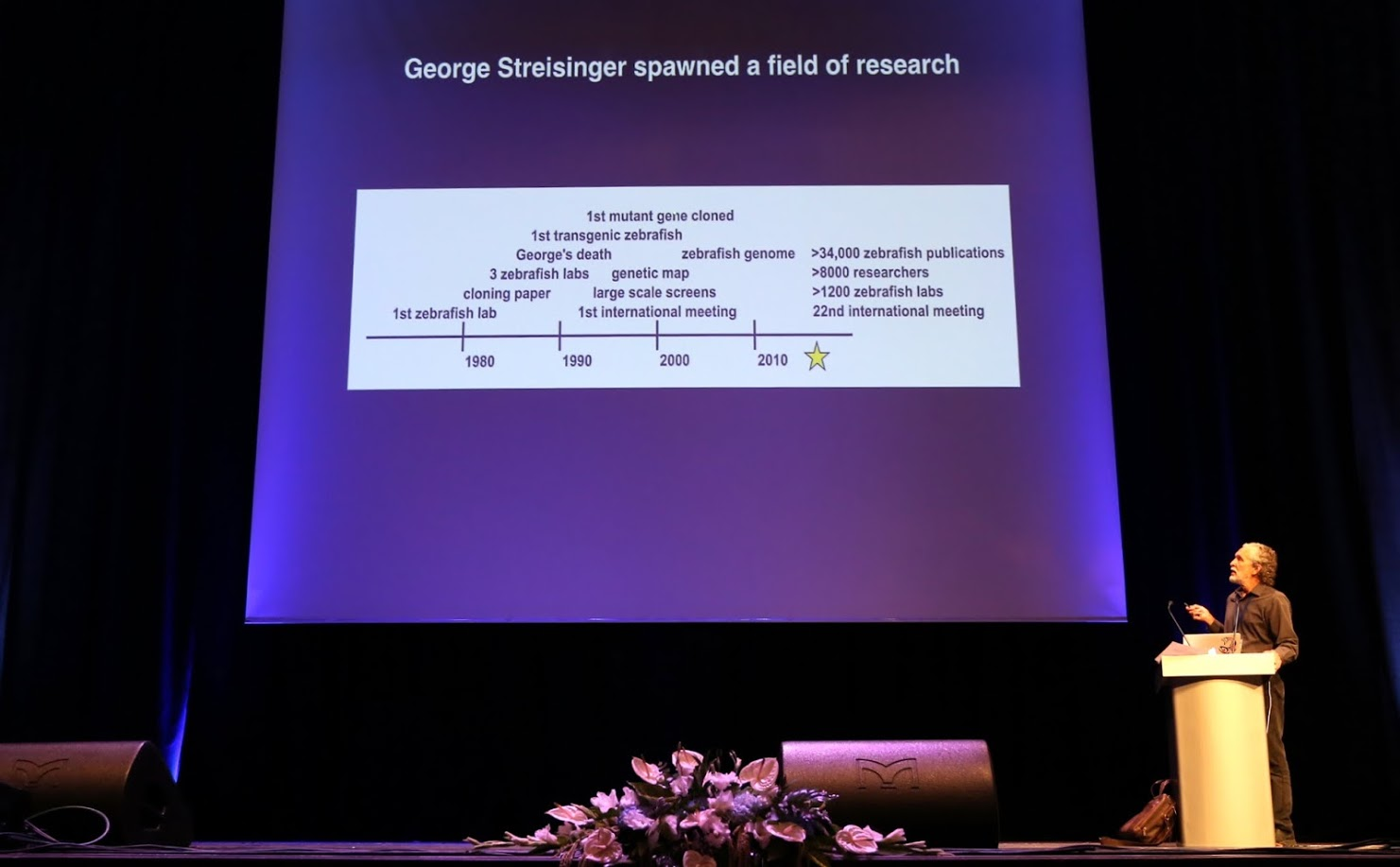
- Monte Westerfield-George Streisinger at the 10th European ZebraFish Meeting, Budapest, Hungary 3–7 July 2017.
- Born: December 27, 1927; Budapest, Hungary
- Died: August 12, 1984 (aged 56)
- Education: Cornell University, University of Illinois (PhD 1953)
- Known for: Cloning zebrafish
- Spouse: Lotte Sielman
- Scientific career
- Fields: Molecular biology, genetics
- Institutions: California Institute of Technology, University of Oregon
- Doctoral advisor: Salvador Luria
- Other academic advisors: Jean Weigle

George Streisinger (December 27, 1927 – August 11, 1984) was an American molecular biologist and co-founder of the Institute of Molecular Biology at the University of Oregon. He was the first person to clone a vertebrate, cloning zebrafish in his University of Oregon laboratory. He also pioneered work in the genetics of the T-even bacterial viruses. In 1972, along with William Franklin Dove he was awarded a Guggenheim Fellowship award, and in 1975 he was selected as a member of the National Academy of Sciences, making him the second Oregonian to receive the distinction. The University of Oregon's Institute of Molecular Biology named their main building "Streisinger Hall" in his honor.

== Personal History ==
George Streisinger was born in Budapest, Hungary, on December 27, 1927. Because they were Jewish, in 1937, his family left Budapest for New York to escape Nazi persecution. Streisinger attended New York public schools and graduated from the Bronx High School of Science in 1944. He obtained a B.S. degree from Cornell University in 1950, and a Ph.D. from the University of Illinois in 1953. He completed postdoctoral studies at the California Institute of Technology from 1953 to 1956. He married Lotte Sielman in 1949. Streisinger accepted a post at the University of Oregon Institute of Molecular Biology in Eugene in 1960. Streisinger was well known as an innovative professor in and out of the classroom, conscripting a dance class to illustrate protein synthesis, and often requested beginning and non-major biology students. He was very politically active, organizing grass-roots resistance to the Vietnam war and legislative opposition to President John F. Kennedy's civil defense program. He testified to successfully ban mutagenic herbicides in Douglas fir reforestation, and led and won a battle to exclude secret war department research from the University of Oregon campus.

His wife, Lotte, was a noted artist and community activist, and the founder of the Eugene Saturday Market, the inspiration for the Portland [Oregon] Saturday Market.

== Research ==
Following his graduation from Cornell, George under- took graduate studies in the genetics of T-even coliphage with Salvador Luria in the Bacteriology Department of the University of Illinois. His studies revealed phenotypic mixing, in which a phage with a host-range genotype of one phage type was found in a particle who was phenotypically dissimilar. When published in 1956, these studies had profound impact on the study of viral biology. During his postdoc at Caltech, with Jean Weigle, he undertook further studies on T2 × T4 hybrids, which led to the discovery of DNA modification (by glucosylation). At the University of Oregon, Streisinger pioneered the study of zebrafish in his lab. Zebrafish can be genetically modified easily, and researchers can modify them to mimic the traits of certain diseases. In analyzing these created diseases, scientists seek solutions to diseases which affect humans. Over 9,000 researchers in 1,551 labs throughout 31 countries study zebrafish, and many of them received their initial training at the University of Oregon.
