= Synthetic Organism Designer =

Organism designer

Synthetic Organism Designer is a piece of software created by Craig Venter's team for designing organisms.
