= Larry Smarr =

American computer scientist (b. 1948)

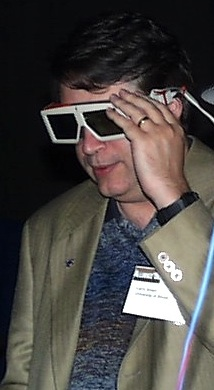
- Larry Smarr viewing an ImmersaDesk
- Born: Larry Lee Smarr; October 16, 1948
- Education: University of Missouri (BA, MS); University of Texas at Austin (PhD)
- Known for: Quantified Self; Metacomputing
- Awards: Member of the National Academy of Engineering; Fellow of the American Physical Society; Fellow of the American Academy of Arts and Sciences; Delmer S. Fahrney Medal (1990); Golden Goose Award (2014)
- Scientific career
- Workplaces: Princeton University; Yale University; Harvard University; University of Illinois at Urbana-Champaign; University of California, San Diego.
- Thesis: The Structure of General Relativity with a Numerical Illustration: The Collision of Two Black Holes (1975)
- Website: lsmarr.calit2.net

Larry Lee Smarr is a physicist and leading pioneer in scientific computing, supercomputer applications, and Internet infrastructure. He is a Distinguished Professor Emeritus at the University of California, San Diego, and was the founding director of the California Institute for Telecommunications and Information Technology, as well as the Harry E. Gruber Endowed Chair of Computer Science and Information Technologies at the Jacobs School of Engineering.

Smarr has been among the most important synthesizers and conductors of innovation, discovery, and commercialization of new technologies–including areas as disparate as the Web browser and personalized medicine. In his career, Smarr has made pioneering breakthroughs in research on black holes, spearheaded the use of supercomputers for academic research, and presided over some of the major innovations which created the modern Internet, including overseeing the development of NCSA Telnet, NCSA Mosaic, and NCSA HTTPd, while he was the founding director of the National Center for Supercomputing Applications, one of the five first national supercomputing centers in the United States. For nearly 20 years, he has been building a new model for academic research based on interdisciplinary collaboration.

== Education ==
Larry Smarr received his Bachelor of Arts and Master of Science degrees from the University of Missouri in Columbia, Missouri, and received a PhD in physics from the University of Texas at Austin in 1975.

== Research ==
After graduating, Smarr performed research at Princeton, Yale, and Harvard. Then joined the faculty of the University of Illinois at Urbana-Champaign in 1979. He is a professor of Computer Science and Information Technologies at the University of California, San Diego.

While at Illinois, Smarr wrote an ambitious proposal to address the future needs of scientific research. Seven other University of Illinois professors joined as co-principal investigators, and many others provided descriptions of what would be accomplished if the proposal were accepted. Formally titled A Center for Scientific and Engineering Supercomputing but known as the Black Proposal (after the color of its cover), it was submitted to the National Science Foundation in 1983. A scant 10 pages, it was the first unsolicited proposal accepted and approved by the NSF, and resulted in the charter of four supercomputer centers (Cornell, Illinois, Princeton, and San Diego), with a fifth (Pittsburgh) added later. In 1985 Smarr became the first director of the Illinois center, the National Center for Supercomputing Applications.

Under Smarr's leadership, the National Center for Supercomputing Applications paved the foundations of the modern internet. NCSA Telnet became popularized as the first Telnet implementation which is able to connect to multiple hosts simultaneously, and NCSA Mosaic, created by Marc Andreessen and Eric Bina, became the first massively popularized graphical web browser, leading to the direct foundations of Netscape Navigator and Internet Explorer. NCSA HTTPd was massively popularized as one of the earliest web servers developed, introduced the Common Gateway Interface, and has been forked as the starting point of the Apache HTTP Server. Smarr continued to promote the benefits of technological innovation to scientific research, such as his advocacy of a high-speed network linking the national centers, which became the NSFNET, one of the significant predecessors of today's Internet. When the NSF revised its funding of supercomputer centers in 1997, he became director of the National Computational Science Alliance, linking dozens of universities and research labs with NCSA to prototype the concept of grid computing.

In 2000, Larry Smarr moved to California and proposed the creation of the California Institute for Telecommunications and Information Technology (Calit2), linking departments and researchers at UC San Diego and UC Irvine. He was the Institute Director of Calit2 from its founding until his retirement in 2020. As part of the work of Calit2, he is the principal investigator on the NSF OptIPuter LambdaGrid project, an "optical backplane for planetary scale distributed computing" and the CAMERA Project, a high-performance computing resource for genomic research.

He attended the Beyond Belief symposium in November 2006 and presented at the 2010 and 2012 Life Extension Conferences. Since 2012, Smarr has been working on a computer-aided study of his own body, in collaboration with Rob Knight.

== Awards and honors ==
Larry Smarr has received numerous honors and awards, including:

- Member of the National Academy of Engineering
- Fellow of the American Physical Society
- Fellow of the American Academy of Arts and Sciences
- Fellow of the IEEE Computer Society
- Franklin Institute's Delmer S. Fahrney Medal for Leadership in Science or Technology (1990)
- Telluride Tech Festival Award of Technology (2005)
- IEEE Computer Society's Tsutomu Kanai Award (2006)
- Golden Goose Award for his work involving black holes and supercomputing (2014)
- Member of the San Diego Science Festival's Nifty Fifty, a collection of the most influential scientists in the San Diego area
