= Viridos (company) =

American synthetic biology company

- Founder: J. Craig Venter
- Type: Private company
- Region served: Worldwide
- Products: Instruments; Reagents; Bioinformatics Tools
- Services: Cell engineering; DNA sequencing; Plasmid preparation; Custom Synthesis
- Board of directors: J. Craig Venter, Ph.D.; Oliver Fetzer, Ph.D, MBA; Reinhard J. Ambros, Ph.D; Juan Enriquez, MBA; David Kiernan, M.D., J.D; Kok-Thay Lim; William McKee; Tina Nova, Ph.D.; Alfonso Romo; Barry Schuler; Hamilton O. Smith, M.D.
- Key people: Oliver Fetzer (CEO); J. Craig Venter; Hamilton O. Smith
- Subsidiaries: Synthetic Genomics Vaccines (SGVI); Genovia Bio
- Website: www.viridos.com

Viridos, before 2021 called Synthetic Genomics Inc. (SGI), is a private company located in La Jolla, California, focused on the field of synthetic biology, especially harnessing photosynthesis with micro algae to create alternatives to fossil fuels. Viridos designs and builds biological systems to address global sustainability problems.

In April 2025, Viridos filed for bankruptcy in Delaware (Case number: 1:25-bk-10697).

Synthetic biology is an interdisciplinary branch of biology and engineering, combining fields such as biotechnology, evolutionary biology, molecular biology, systems biology, biophysics, computer engineering, and genetic engineering. Synthetic Genomics uses techniques such as software engineering, bioprocessing, bioinformatics, biodiscovery, analytical chemistry, fermentation, cell optimization, and DNA synthesis to design and build biological systems. The company produces or performs research in the fields of sustainable bio-fuels, insect resistant crops, transplantable organs, targeted medicines, DNA synthesis instruments as well as a number of biological reagents.

== Core markets ==
SGI mainly operates in three end markets: research, bioproduction and applied products. The research segment focuses on genomics solutions for academic and commercial research organizations. The commercial products and services include instrumentation, reagents, DNA synthesis services, and bioinformatics services and software. In 2015, the company launched the BioXP 3200 system, a fully automated benchtop instrument that produces DNA fragments from many different sources for genomic data.

The company's efforts in bio-based production are intended to improve both existing production hosts and develop entirely new synthetic production hosts with the goal of more efficient routes to bioproducts.

SGI has a number of commercial as well as research and development stage programs across a variety of industries. Some of these research partnerships include:

Partner	Focus	Target
United Therapeutics	Organ Transplantation	To reduce the risk of rejection in organ transplantation
Novartis Vaccines	Vaccines	To stockpile synthetic flu vaccines for rapid response to global flu outbreaks
ADM	Food Oil	To provide nutritional oils that overcome cost barrier in multiple applications
Monsanto	Agriculture	To map microbiome metagenome related to plant health and crop yield
ExxonMobil	Biodiesel	To develop an algae platform that can produce economically viable biodiesel

== History ==
Synthetic Genomics was founded in the spring of 2005 by J. Craig Venter, Nobel Laureate Hamilton O. Smith, Juan Enriquez, and David Kiernan. Venter (and Smith)'s previous company, Celera Genomics, was a driving force in the race to sequence the human genome. The firm takes its name from the phrase synthetic genomics which is a scientific discipline of synthetic biology related to the generation of organisms artificially using genetic material.

Many of SGI's collaborations have been with energy companies. In 2007, SGI worked with BP to commercialize microbial-based processes for increasing the conversion and recovery of subsurface hydrocarbons. In 2009, SGI received funding from ExxonMobil to produce biofuels on an industrial-scale using recombinant algae and other microorganisms. The company purchased an 81-acre site (33 ha) in the Imperial Valley in Southern California to produce algae fuel for their collaboration with Exxon Mobil. They also signed a collaborative agreement with New England Biolabs to Launch Gibson Assembly Master Mix Product for Synthetic and Molecular Biology Applications in 2012.

In 2010, Synthetic Genomics spun off a new subsidiary, Synthetic Genomics Vaccines Inc., to develop next generation vaccines

In 2014 SGI expanded into the field of organ transplantation with a collaborative agreement with United Therapeutics valued at $50M and brought in Oliver Fetzer as CEO.
