= Werner Arber =

Swiss microbiologist and geneticist (born 1929)

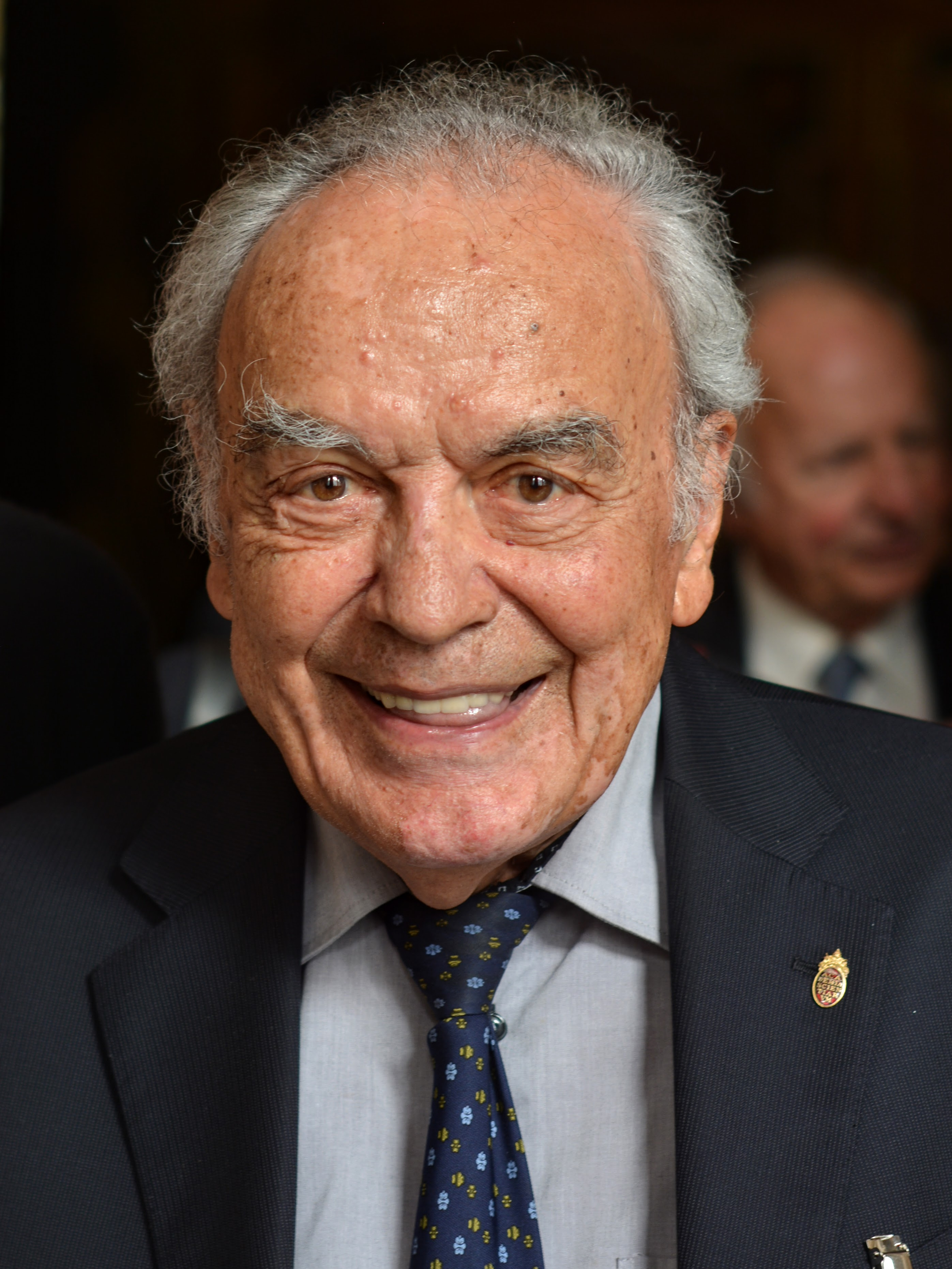
- Arber in 2018
- Born: 3 June 1929 (age 97); Gränichen, Switzerland
- Education: Old Cantonal School Aarau; ETH Zurich
- Known for: restriction endonucleases
- Children: Silvia Arber
- Awards: 1978 Nobel Prize in Physiology or Medicine
- Scientific career
- Fields: Microbiology
- Workplaces: University of Geneva, University of Basel, University of Southern California

Werner Arber (born 3 June 1929 in Gränichen, Aargau) is a Swiss microbiologist and geneticist. Along with American researchers Hamilton Smith and Daniel Nathans, Werner Arber shared the 1978 Nobel Prize in Physiology or Medicine for the discovery of restriction endonucleases. Their work would lead to the development of recombinant DNA technology.

== Life and career ==
Letters from Daisy Dussoix in 1978 where she expresses her frustration about the lack of recognition of her research which led Werner Arber to obtain the Nobel prize

Arber studied chemistry and physics at the Swiss Federal Institute of Technology in Zürich from 1949 to 1953. Late in 1953, he took an assistantship for electron microscopy at the University of Geneva, in time left the electron microscope, went on to research bacteriophages and write his dissertation on defective lambda prophage mutants. In his Nobel Autobiography, he writes:

In the summer of 1956, we learned about experiments made by Larry Morse and Esther and Joshua Lederberg on the lambda-mediated transduction (gene transfer from one bacterial strain to another by a bacteriophage serving as vector) of bacterial determinants for galactose fermentation. Since these investigators had encountered defective lysogenic strains among their transductants, we felt that such strains should be included in the collection of lambda prophage mutants under study in our laboratory. Very rapidly, thanks to the stimulating help by Jean Weigle and Grete Kellenberger, this turned out to be extremely fruitful. ... This was the end of my career as an electron microscopist and in chosing [sic] genetic and physiological approaches I became a molecular geneticist.

Arber received his doctorate in 1958 from the University of Geneva. He then worked at the University of Southern California in phage genetics with Gio ("Joe") Bertani starting in the summer of 1958. Late in 1959 he accepted an offer to return to Geneva at the beginning of 1960, but only after spending "several very fruitful weeks" at each of the laboratories of Gunther Stent (University of California, Berkeley), Joshua Lederberg and Esther Lederberg (Stanford University) and Salvador Luria (Massachusetts Institute of Technology). Arber notes that it was in 1963, while he was a researcher in Stent's Berkeley lab, when experiments produced the first evidence that modification in E. coli B and K is brought about by nucleotide methylation.

Back at the University of Geneva, Arber worked in a laboratory in the basement of the Physics Institute, where he carried out productive research and hosted "a number of first class graduate students, postdoctoral fellows and senior scientists." including Daisy Roulland Dussoix, whose work helped him to later obtain the Nobel Prize. In 1965, the University of Geneva promoted him to Extraordinary Professor for Molecular Genetics. In 1971, after spending a year as a visiting Miller Professor in the Department of Molecular Biology at Berkeley, Arber moved to the University of Basel. In Basel, he was one of the first persons to work in the newly constructed Biozentrum, which housed the departments of biophysics, biochemistry, microbiology, structural biology, cell biology and pharmacology and was thus conducive to interdisciplinary research.

On 27 occasions since 1981, Werner Arber has shared his expertise and passion for science with young scientists at the Lindau Nobel Laureate Meetings.

Arber is member of the World Knowledge Dialogue Scientific Board and of the Pontifical Academy of Sciences since 1981. In 1981, Arber became a founding member of the World Cultural Council. He was elected a Fellow of the American Academy of Arts and Sciences in 1984. Pope Benedict XVI appointed him as President of the Pontifical Academy of Sciences in January 2011, making him the first Protestant to hold the position. In 2017, Arber retired as President of the Pontifical Academy of Sciences and was replaced by German scientist Joachim von Braun.

== Personal life ==
Arber is married and has two daughters, including Silvia Arber.

Arber is a Christian and theistic evolutionist, stating "The most primitive cells may require at least several hundred different specific biological macromolecules. How such already quite complex structures may have come together, remains a mystery to me. The possibility of the existence of a Creator, of God, represents to me a satisfactory solution to this problem." In addition, he has affirmed: "I know that the concept of God helped me to master many questions in life; it guides me in critical situations, and I see it confirmed in many deep insights into the beauty of the functioning of the world."

Catholic Church titles
| Preceded by Nicola Cabibbo | President of the Pontifical Academy of Sciences; 15 January 2011 – 2017 | Succeeded by Joachim von Braun |
