= Grete Kellenberger-Gujer =

Swiss molecular biologist (1919-2011)

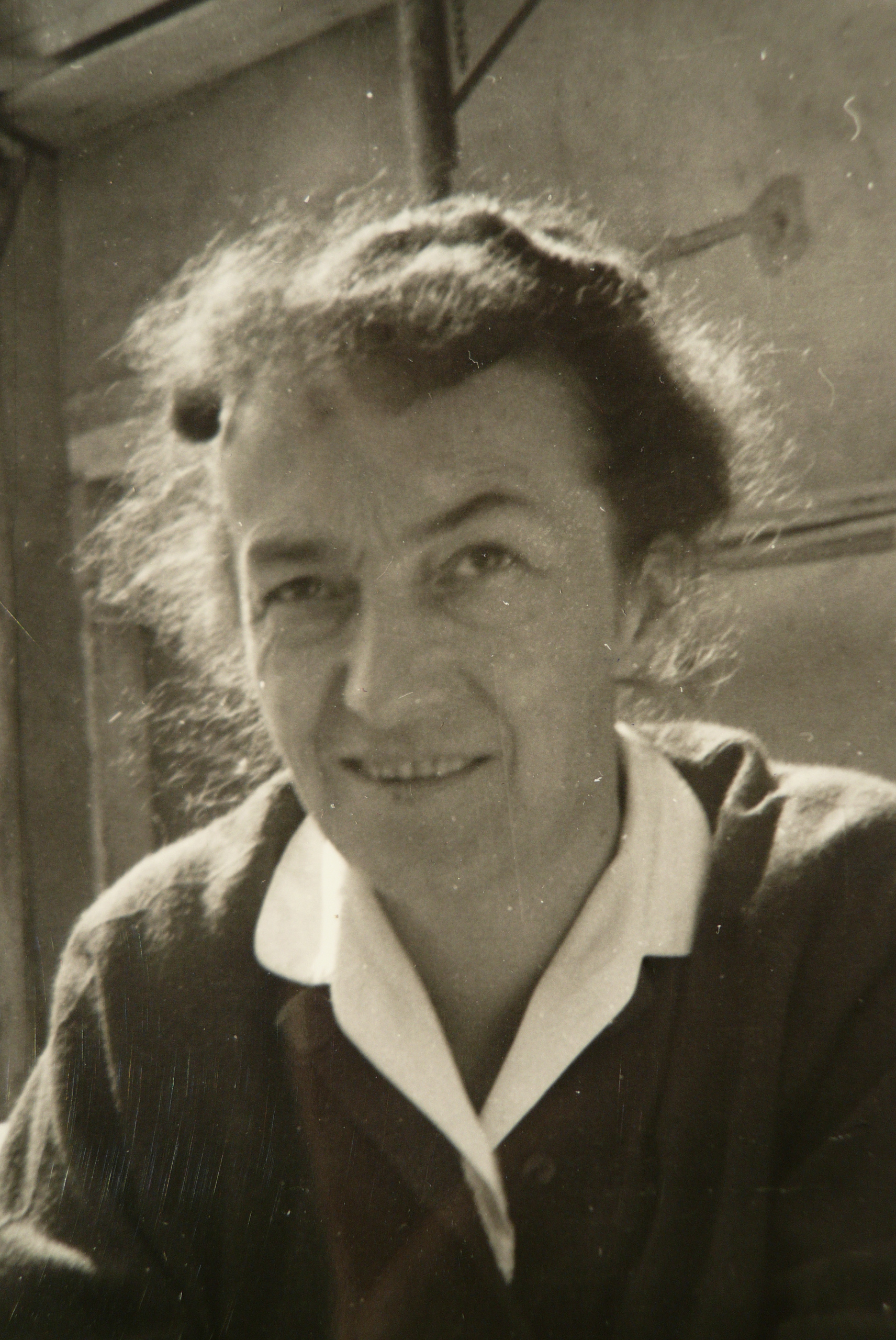
- Born: November 12, 1919; Rümlang, Zürich, Switzerland
- Died: March 13, 2011 (aged 91); Bülach, Switzerland
- Awards: Nessim-Habif World Prize, University of Geneva, 1979

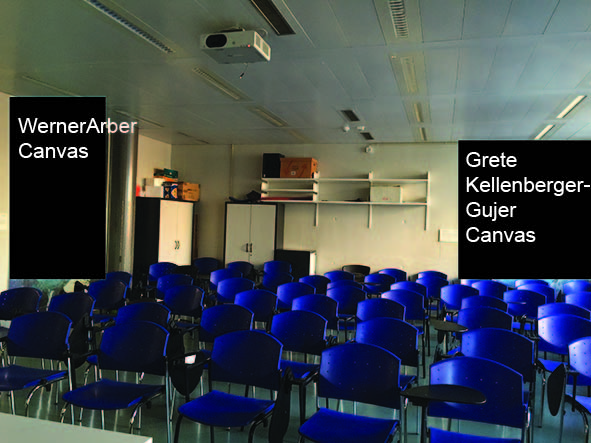
Seminar Room Department Molecular Biology (veiled canvases)

Grete Kellenberger-Gujer (1919–2011) was a Swiss molecular biologist known for her discoveries on genetic recombination and restriction modification system of DNA. She was a pioneer in the genetic analysis of bacteriophages and contributed to the early development of molecular biology.

== Biography ==
After earning her matura in classics at the Töchterschule in Zürich, Grete Gujer studied chemistry at the Swiss Federal Institute of Technology in Zurich. There, she met Eduard Kellenberger, a physics student. The couple married in 1945. In 1946 they moved to Geneva, where Eduard Kellenberger began his doctoral work thesis under the supervision of Jean Weigle, professor of physics at the University of Geneva. Grete Kellenberger contributed to the development of new methods to prepare and analyse biological samples using an electron microscope, a new technique at the time. After Jean Weigle left for the California Institute of Technology in 1948, Grete Kellenberger took on an increasingly important role in the study of lambda phage and its mutations at the University of Geneva. Her collaboration with Jean Weigle, who returned to Geneva every summer, is demonstrated their by regular correspondence archived at Caltech and by numerous publications.

It was Grete Kellenberger who gave Werner Arber, who carried out his PhD between 1954 and 1958, the conceptual basis and practices for his future studies in the genetics of bacteriophages. Grete Kellenberger published several articles with Arber between 1957 and 1966.

Grete Kellenberger's major scientific contribution was the discovery that recombination is due to a physical exchange of DNA, and not to selective replication. An article on this subject authored by Grete Kellenberger, Maria Ludovica Zichichi, and Jean Weigle was published in the same issue of the Proceedings of the National Academy of Sciences (PNAS) as the article from Meselson and Weigle on the topic. However, although the data for Grete's article were obtained using a more original approach and were ready months before experiments were concluded in Meselson's laboratory, Grete's article appeared after Meselson's.

Maria Ludovica Zichichi worked with Grete Kellenberger from 1960 to 1962, and their collaboration resulted in five publications.

In 1965, Grete Kellenberger, her husband Eduard Kellenberger, and members of their research team left for Manhattan, Kansas for a sabbatical year. At Kansas State University, she worked closely with Ulrich Laemmli on phage T4. During this year, Eduard Kellenberger returned to Switzerland without his wife and they divorced in 1967. Grete Kellenberger-Gujer continued to work in Kansas and later accepted a position as an independent researcher in a lab run by Lucien Caro at the Oak Ridge National Laboratory in Tennessee. In 1971, she returned to Geneva and worked in Lucien Caro's lab in the Department of Molecular Biology until her retirement in 1980. From 1971 to 1975, she worked with Douglas Berg, with whom she shared an interest in genetic analysis of bacteriophages and plasmid lambda dv. She published three articles with Berg.

She was an atheist and she respected religious believers.

== Awards and recognition ==
In 1979, the Faculty of Medicine of the University of Geneva awarded Grete Kellenberger-Gujer the International Prize Nessim-Habif. An honoris causa doctorate for Grete-Kellenberger was discussed at the University of Geneva, but was never awarded. In 2009, three portraits of Grete Kellenberger-Gujer were created by the Roger Pfund studio and displayed as part of an exhibit commemorating representative individuals from the University of Geneva as part of the university's 450th anniversary. Grete's portrait is hung since 2010 in the university's Department of Molecular Biology seminar room, across from the portrait of Werner Arber. In September 2016, the Campus magazine of the University of Geneva published an article on the story of Grete-Kellenberger-Gujer described in, without including any of the sociological considerations and cultural and academic gender-bias facts explored in the article.
