= Global Ocean Sampling Expedition =

Project to assess marine genetic diversity

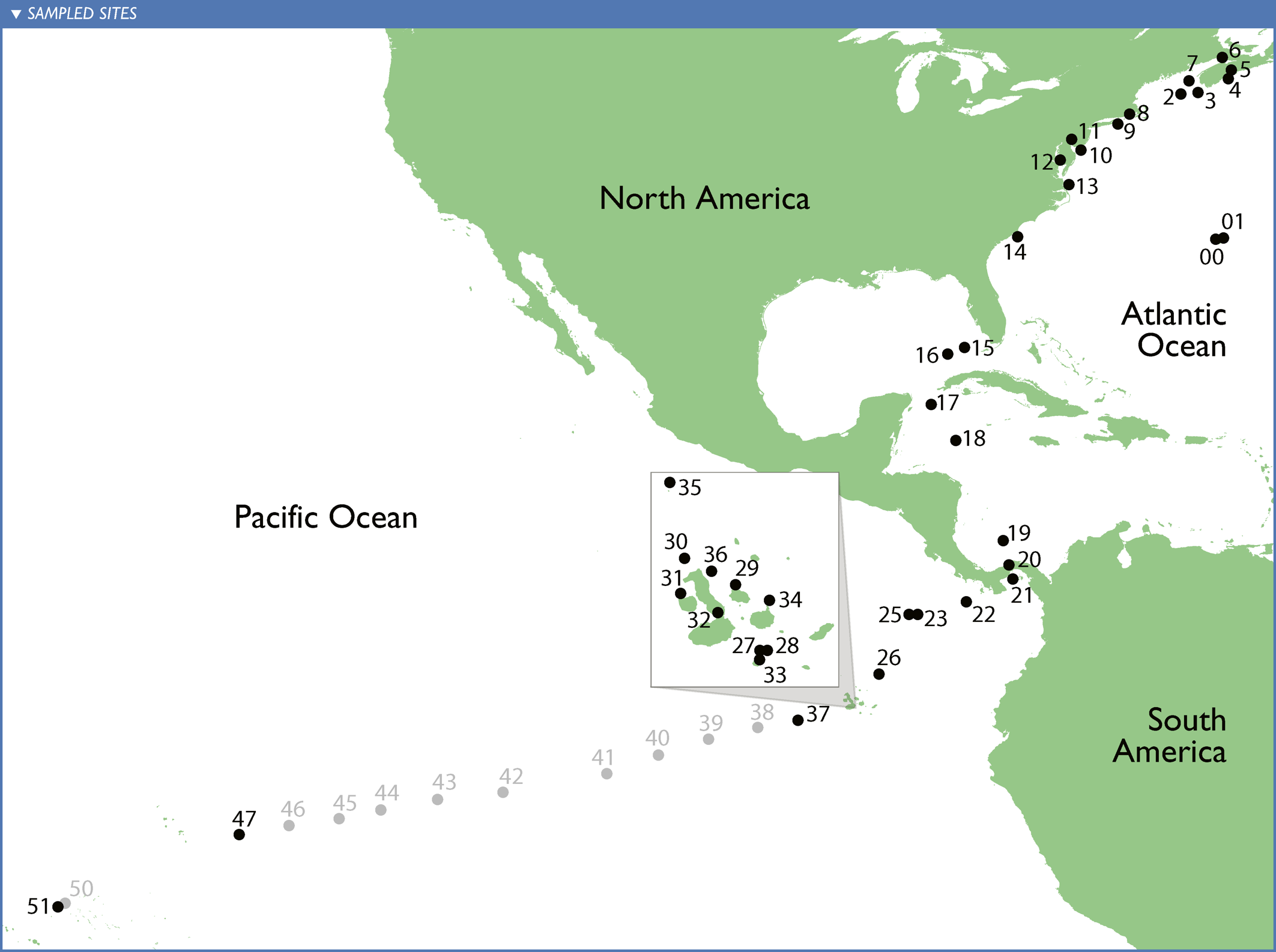
Sampling sites of the Sorcerer II.

The Global Ocean Sampling Expedition (GOS) is an ocean exploration genome project whose goal is to assess genetic diversity in marine microbial communities and to understand their role in nature's fundamental processes. The two-year journey, which used Craig Venter's personal yacht, originated in Halifax, Canada, circumnavigated the globe and terminated in the U.S. in January 2006. The expedition sampled water from Halifax, Nova Scotia, to the Eastern Tropical Pacific Ocean. During 2007, sampling continued along the west coast of North America.

== Data analysis ==
The GOS datasets were submitted to both NCBI and Community Cyberinfrastructure for Advanced Marine Microbial Ecology Research and Analysis (CAMERA), a new online resource for marine metagenomics funded by the Gordon and Betty Moore Foundation, developed by JCVI and hosted by UC San Diego's Division of the California Institute for Telecommunications and Information Technology (Calit2). CAMERA's toolset was developed by JCVI, and reflects the tools used in the initial publication of the GOS datasets.

== Funding ==
The Sorcerer II effort has been funded by:

- the Gordon and Betty Moore Foundation (sequencing and analysis)
- the United States Department of Energy, Office of Science (sequencing and analysis)
- The J. Craig Venter Institute (vessel operation)
- Moore Foundation seven-year, $24.5 million, grant (CAMERA)

== Vessel ==
History
- Name: Sorcerer II
- Builder: Cookson
- Launched: 1998
- Motto: –

General characteristics
- Length: 28.95 m (95.0 ft)
- Beam: 7.08 m (23.2 ft)
- Draught: 2.84 m (9 ft 4 in)
- Propulsion: One Cummins 300 HP

Sorcerer II, a 95-foot sloop, completed a 2-year scientific expedition circumnavigating the globe in mid latitudes collecting samples of microbes in seawater for genetic sequencing and cataloguing. She was designed to be not just a world cruising yacht, but one that would be capable of handling the extremes in latitudes, from equatorial heat and humidity to latitudes between 60 and 70 degrees. SORCERER II's construction is light for performance, but very strong, with her kevlar and E glass laminates, epoxy bonding and carefully chosen core materials.

The vessel was designed by German Frers and carries 2,400 litres (630 US gal) of water.

== Publications ==
The following list is of the official publications of the project and the J. Craig Venter Institute.

- Venter, JC; Remington, K; Heidelberg, JF; Halpern, AL; Rusch, D; Eisen, JA; Wu, D; Paulsen, I; et al. (2 April 2004). "Environmental Genome Shotgun Sequencing of the Sargasso Sea". Science. 304 (5667). New York, New York: American Association for the Advancement of Science: 66–74. Bibcode:2004Sci...304...66V. doi:10.1126/science.1093857. ISSN 0193-4511. PMID 15001713. S2CID 1454587.
- Yooseph, S; Sutton, G; Rusch, DB; Halpern, AL; Williamson, SJ; Remington, K; Eisen, JA; Heidelberg, KB; et al. (13 March 2007). "The Sorcerer II Global Ocean Sampling Expedition: Expanding the Universe of Protein Families". PLOS Biology. 5 (3) e16. USA: Public Library of Science. doi:10.1371/journal.pbio.0050016. ISSN 1544-9173. PMC 1821046. PMID 17355171.
- Kannan, N; Taylor, SS; Zhai, Y; Venter, JC; Manning, G (13 March 2007). "Structural and Functional Diversity of the Microbial Kinome". PLOS Biology. 5 (3) e17. USA: Public Library of Science. doi:10.1371/journal.pbio.0050017. ISSN 1544-9173. PMC 1821047. PMID 17355172.
- Rusch, DB; Halpern, AL; Sutton, G; Heidelberg, KB; Williamson, S; Yooseph, S; Wu, D; Eisen, JA; et al. (13 March 2007). "The Sorcerer II Global Ocean Sampling Expedition: Northwest Atlantic through Eastern Tropical Pacific". PLOS Biology. 5 (3) e77. USA: Public Library of Science. doi:10.1371/journal.pbio.0050077. ISSN 1544-9173. PMC 1821060. PMID 17355176.
- Yutin, N; Suzuki, MT; Teeling, H; Weber, M; Venter, JC; Rusch, DB; Béjà, O (1 June 2007). "Assessing diversity and biogeography of aerobic anoxygenic phototrophic bacteria in surface waters of the Atlantic and Pacific Oceans using the Global Ocean Sampling expedition metagenomes" (PDF). Environmental Microbiology. 9 (6). England: Blackwell Science: 1464–75. Bibcode:2007EnvMi...9.1464Y. doi:10.1111/j.1462-2920.2007.01265.x. ISSN 1462-2912. PMID 17504484.
- Sharon, I; Tzahor, S; Williamson, S; Shmoish, M; Man-Aharonovich, D; Rusch, DB; Yooseph, S; Zeidner, G; et al. (1 October 2007). "Viral photosynthetic reaction center genes and transcripts in the marine environment". The ISME Journal. 1 (6). England: Nature Publishing Group: 492–501. Bibcode:2007ISMEJ...1..492S. doi:10.1038/ismej.2007.67. ISSN 1751-7362. PMID 18043651.
- Williamson, SJ; Rusch, DB; Yooseph, S; Halpern, AL; Heidelberg, KB; Glass, JI; Andrews-Pfannkoch, C; Fadrosh, D; et al. (23 January 2008). Hall, Neil (ed.). "The Sorcerer II Global Ocean Sampling Expedition: Metagenomic Characterization of Viruses within Aquatic Microbial Samples". PLoS ONE. 3 (1) e1456. USA: Public Library of Science. Bibcode:2008PLoSO...3.1456W. doi:10.1371/journal.pone.0001456. ISSN 1932-6203. PMC 2186209. PMID 18213365.
- Shaw, AK; Halpern, AL; Beeson, K; Tran, B; Venter, JC; Martiny, JBH (10 September 2008). "It's all relative: ranking the diversity of aquatic bacterial communities". Environmental Microbiology. 10 (9). England: Blackwell Science: 2200–10. Bibcode:2008EnvMi..10.2200S. doi:10.1111/j.1462-2920.2008.01626.x. ISSN 1462-2912. PMID 18637951.

== See also ==
- Landform
- Microorganisms
- Metagenomics
