= Hamilton O. Smith =

American biologist (1931–2025)

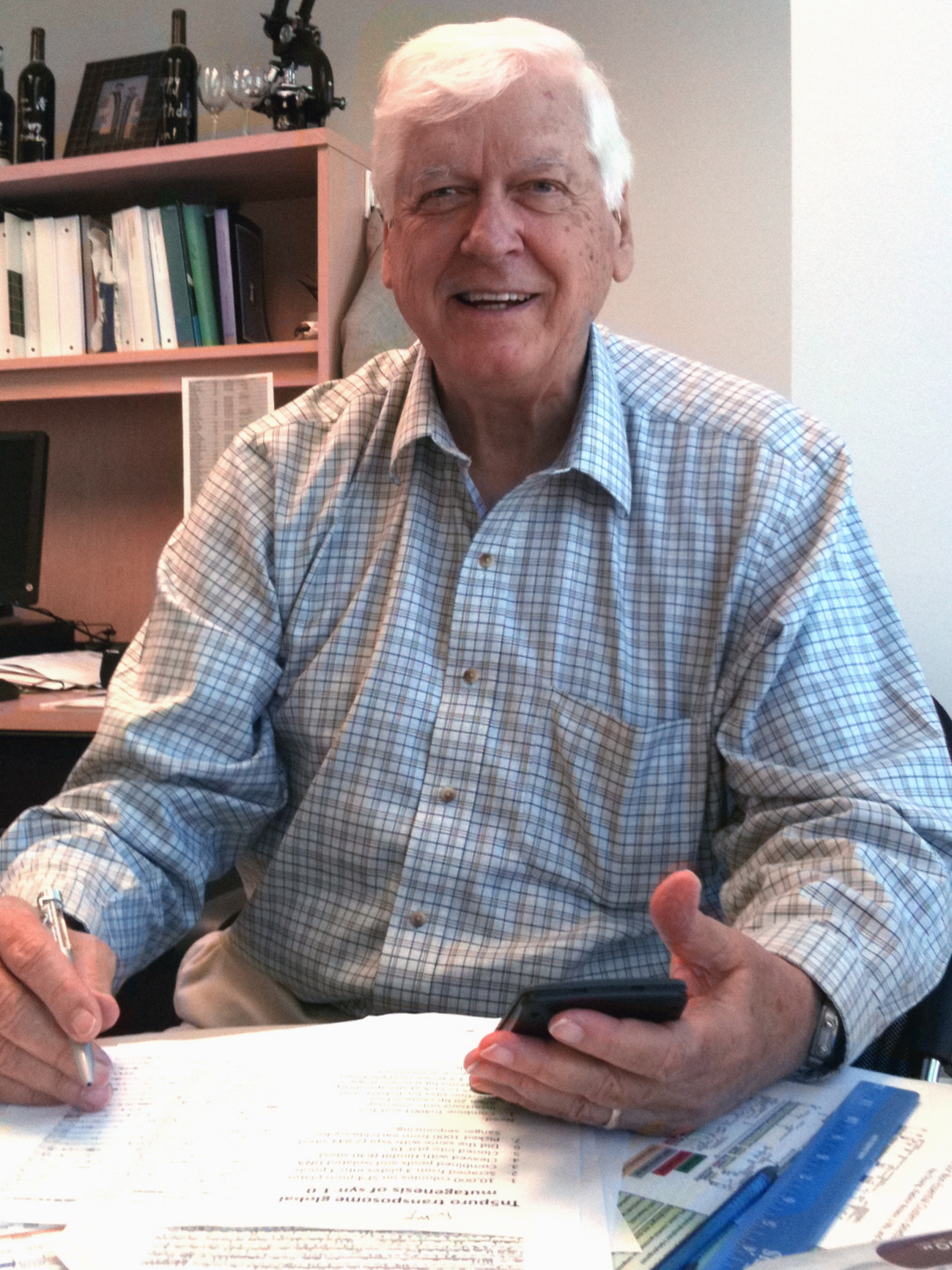
- Smith in 2012
- Born: August 23, 1931; New York City, U.S
- Died: October 25, 2025 (aged 94); Ellicott City, Maryland, U.S.
- Education: University of California, Berkeley, BA; Johns Hopkins School of Medicine, MD
- Known for: Restriction enzymes
- Awards: Nobel Prize in Physiology or Medicine in 1978
- Scientific career
- Fields: Molecular biology, biochemistry, genomics
- Workplaces: Washington University School of Medicine

Hamilton Othanel Smith (August 31, 1931 – October 25, 2025) was an American microbiologist and Nobel laureate.

== Early life and education ==
Hamilton Othanel Smith was born in New York City on August 31, 1931 and grew up in Urbana-Champaign, Illinois.

Smith graduated from University Laboratory High School of Urbana, Illinois. He attended the University of Illinois at Urbana-Champaign, but in 1950 transferred to the University of California, Berkeley, where he earned his B.A. in Mathematics in 1952. He received his medical degree from Johns Hopkins School of Medicine in 1956. Between 1956 and 1957 Smith worked for the Washington University in St. Louis Medical Service.

During the next few years he undertook US Navy military service as well as a medical residency at Henry Ford Hospital. Hamilton then went to the University of Michigan in Ann Arbor on a US National Institutes of Health fellowship where he worked with infectious disease expert Myron M. Levine.

In 1975, he was awarded a Guggenheim Fellowship he spent at the University of Zurich.

== Scientific career ==
In 1970, Smith and Kent W. Wilcox discovered the first type II restriction enzyme, which is now known as HindII. Smith went on to discover DNA methylases that constitute the other half of the bacterial host restriction and modification systems, as hypothesized by Werner Arber of Switzerland.

Smith was awarded the Nobel Prize in Physiology or Medicine in 1978 for discovering type II restriction enzymes with Werner Arber and Daniel Nathans as co-recipients.

He later became a leading figure in the nascent field of genomics, when in 1995 he and a team at The Institute for Genomic Research sequenced the first bacterial genome, that of Haemophilus influenzae. H. influenza was the same organism in which Smith had discovered restriction enzymes in the late 1960s. He subsequently played a key role in the sequencing of many of the early genomes at The Institute for Genomic Research, and in the assembly of the human genome at Celera Genomics, which he joined when it was founded in 1998.

Smith later directed a team at the J. Craig Venter Institute that worked towards creating a partially synthetic bacterium, Mycoplasma laboratorium. In 2003 the same group synthetically assembled the genome of a virus, Phi X 174 bacteriophage. Smith was scientific director of privately held Synthetic Genomics, which was founded in 2005 by Craig Venter to continue this work. Synthetic Genomics is working to produce biofuels on an industrial-scale using recombinant algae and other microorganisms.

== Personal life and death ==
Smith was married to Liz Smith until her death and they had five children. They also had 12 grandchildren and 15 great grandchildren. One son preceded him in death.

Smith was diagnosed with lymphoma in 2016. He died at his home in Ellicott City, Maryland, on October 25, 2025, at the age of 94.
