= Giuseppe Bertani =

Microbial geneticist (1923–2015)

Giuseppe Bertani (October 23, 1923–April 7, 2015) was a microbial geneticist who did work with Drosophila melanogaster, mutation rates in E. coli, and spent most of his career working with phages, specifically phage P2.

Bertani created Lysogeny broth, also known as Luria-Bertani medium or Lennox Broth.

== Life and career ==
Giuseppe Bertani was born in Como, Italy, on October 23, 1923, but grew up in Milan with his family. After completing school, he studied at the University of Milan. In 1945 he was awarded a Laureate in Natural Science for his contributions to the field of Zoology. He did a zoology fellowship in Naples, Italy for two years before heading to Zurich, Switzerland to do further genetic studies. There he did research on developmental problems in Drosophila melanogaster with Ernst Hadorn. In 1948 he moved to the US to work under Milislav Demerec at the Cold Spring Harbor Laboratory in Long Island N.Y. Here he was introduced to microbial genetics and shifted his work from Drosophila melanogaster to microbial genetics and phages. In 1949 he went to Indiana University as a research associate with Salvador Luria and began deeper studies into lysogeny. After his research group moved their lab to Illinois, he met Elizabeth Teegarden who eventually became his wife. In 1954 he transferred to Caltech to continue his research with Max Delbrück and in 1957 he became a medical school professor at the University of Southern California, in Los Angeles. In the late 1950's/early 1960's he transferred to Karolinska Institute in Sweden. He also taught advanced microbiology courses at the University of Stockholm during this time. In 1981 he resigned as professor and went to work at the Jet Propulsion Laboratory in Pasadena, California. Here he studied methanogenic bacteria. Bertani died on April 7, 2015.

== Creation of the LB Medium ==
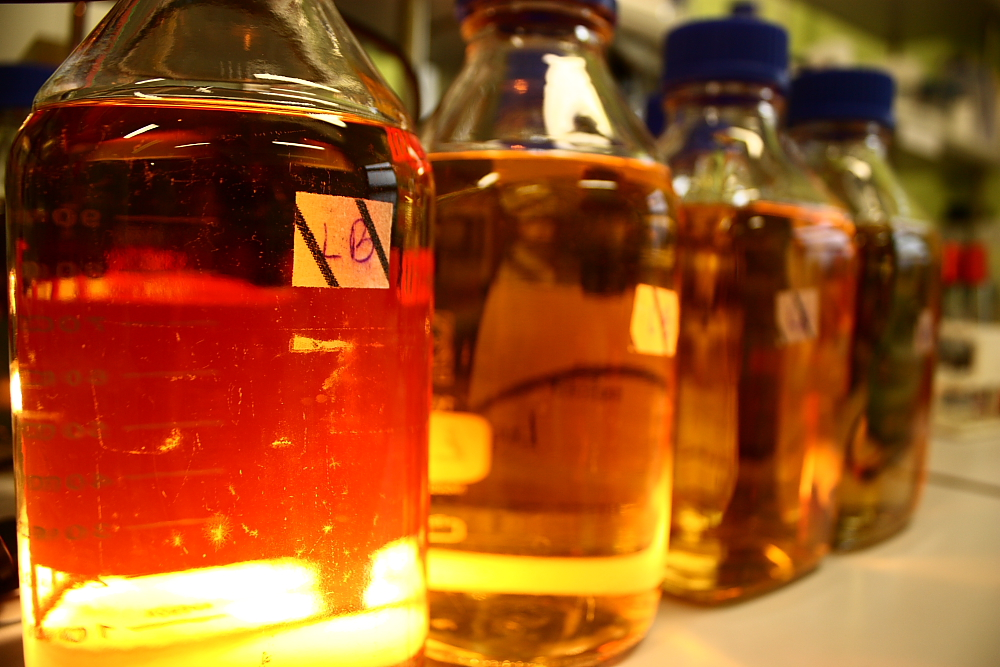
Lysogeny Broth

In 1948, around the time Bertani turned 25 years old, he migrated to the United states as a Carnegie Fellow. He was invited to work in a group with Milislav Demeric. He quickly shifted from his work in Drosophila genetics to become a pioneer in the field of microbial genetics. Through this network he eventually met Salvador Luria, a professor at Indiana university, and joined him as a research associate. It was here that he requested Luria to give him the opportunity to study lysogeny. He was provided with lysogenic E. coli Lisbonne strain and a Shigella strain. Using these, he was able to show that the production of phages by a lysogen was discontinuous and involved rare, large bursts of phage. His further studies into the Lisbonne strain of E. coli's phages led him to develop the famous LB (lysogeny broth) medium.

== Discovery of host control variation ==
In 1953, Bertani was one of the first scientists to describe host controlled variation alongside his colleague Salvador Luria. He showed evidence for it with experiments with two different variations of virus, and once he had passed the viruses through a host it would change the selectivity making it almost impossible for one of the two original variations to grow and spread. It is a process that does not involve mutation and selection. Bertani assumed that a phage existed that was almost entirely based on the host and was used in replication that created these host control variations.
