= Daniel Nathans =

American microbiologist

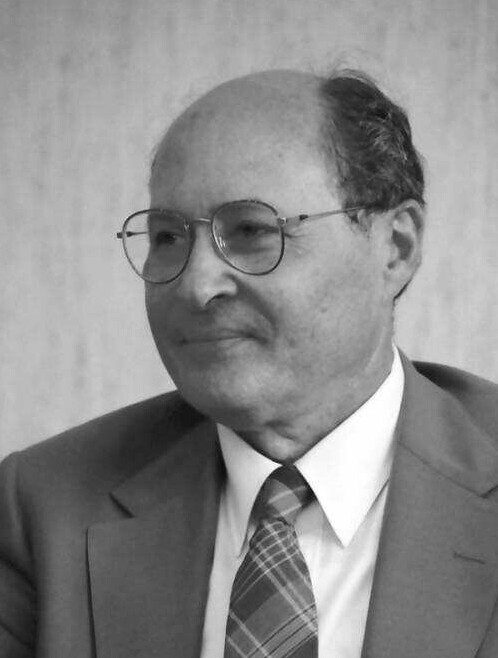

Interim President of Johns Hopkins University
- In office June 1, 1995 – September 1, 1996
- Preceded by: William C. Richardson
- Succeeded by: William R. Brody

Personal details
- Born: October 30, 1928 Wilmington, Delaware, U.S
- Died: November 16, 1999 (aged 71) Baltimore, Maryland, U.S
- Spouse: Joanne Gomberg
- Children: Benjamin Nathans (son)
- Education: University of Delaware (BS); Washington University in St. Louis (MD)
- Awards: NAS Award in Molecular Biology (1976); Nobel Prize in Physiology or Medicine (1978); National Medal of Science (1993)

Daniel Nathans (October 30, 1928 – November 16, 1999) was an American microbiologist. Along with American researcher Hamilton Smith and Swiss researcher Werner Arber, he shared the 1978 Nobel Prize in Physiology or Medicine for the discovery of restriction enzymes and their application in restriction mapping.

== Early life and education ==
Nathans was born in Wilmington, Delaware, the last of nine children born to Russian Jewish immigrant parents, Sarah (Levitan) and Samuel Nathans. During the Great Depression his father lost his small business and was unemployed for a long time.

Nathans attended public schools and then to the University of Delaware, where he received his B.S. degree in chemistry in 1950. He received his M.D. degree from Washington University School of Medicine in 1954 and did a one-year internship at Presbyterian Medical Center with Robert Loeb.

Wanting a break before his medical residency, Nathans became a clinical associate at the National Cancer Institute at the National Institutes of Health in Bethesda, Maryland. There he split his time between caring for patients receiving experimental cancer chemotherapy and research on recently discovered plasma-cell tumors in mice, similar to human multiple myeloma. Struck by how little was known about cancer biology, he became interested in protein synthesis in myeloma tumors, and published his first papers on this research.

Nathans returned to Columbia Presbyterian Medical Center for a two-year residency in 1957, again on Robert Loeb's service. He continued working on the problem of protein synthesis as time allowed. In 1959, he decided to work on the research full time and became a research associate at Fritz Lipmann's lab at the Rockefeller Institute in New York.

== Career ==
In 1962, Nathans came to Johns Hopkins School of Medicine as an assistant professor of microbiology. He was promoted to associate professor in 1965 and to professor in 1967. He became the director of the microbiology department in 1972 and served in that position until 1982. In 1981, the department of microbiology was renamed the department of molecular biology and genetics.

In 1982 Johns Hopkins University made Nathans a university professor, a position in which he served until his death in 1999. He also became a senior investigator of the Howard Hughes Medical Institute unit at Johns Hopkins School of Medicine in 1982.

From 1995 to 1996, Nathans served as the interim president of Johns Hopkins University.

In January 1999, Johns Hopkins School of Medicine established the McKusick-Nathans Institute of Genetic Medicine, a multidisciplinary clinical and research center named for Nathans and pioneering medical geneticist Victor McKusick.

Nathans was also given six honorary doctorates over the span of his career.

== Awards ==
- 1967: Selman Waksman Award in Microbiology
- 1976: NAS Award in Molecular Biology
- 1977: Elected to the American Academy of Arts and Sciences
- 1978: Nobel Prize in Physiology or Medicine
- 1979: Elected to the National Academy of Sciences
- 1985: Elected to the American Philosophical Society
- 1993: National Medal of Science

== See also ==
- List of Jewish Nobel laureates
