= J. Craig Venter Institute =

Nonprofit genomics research institute

J. Craig Venter Institute (JCVI)
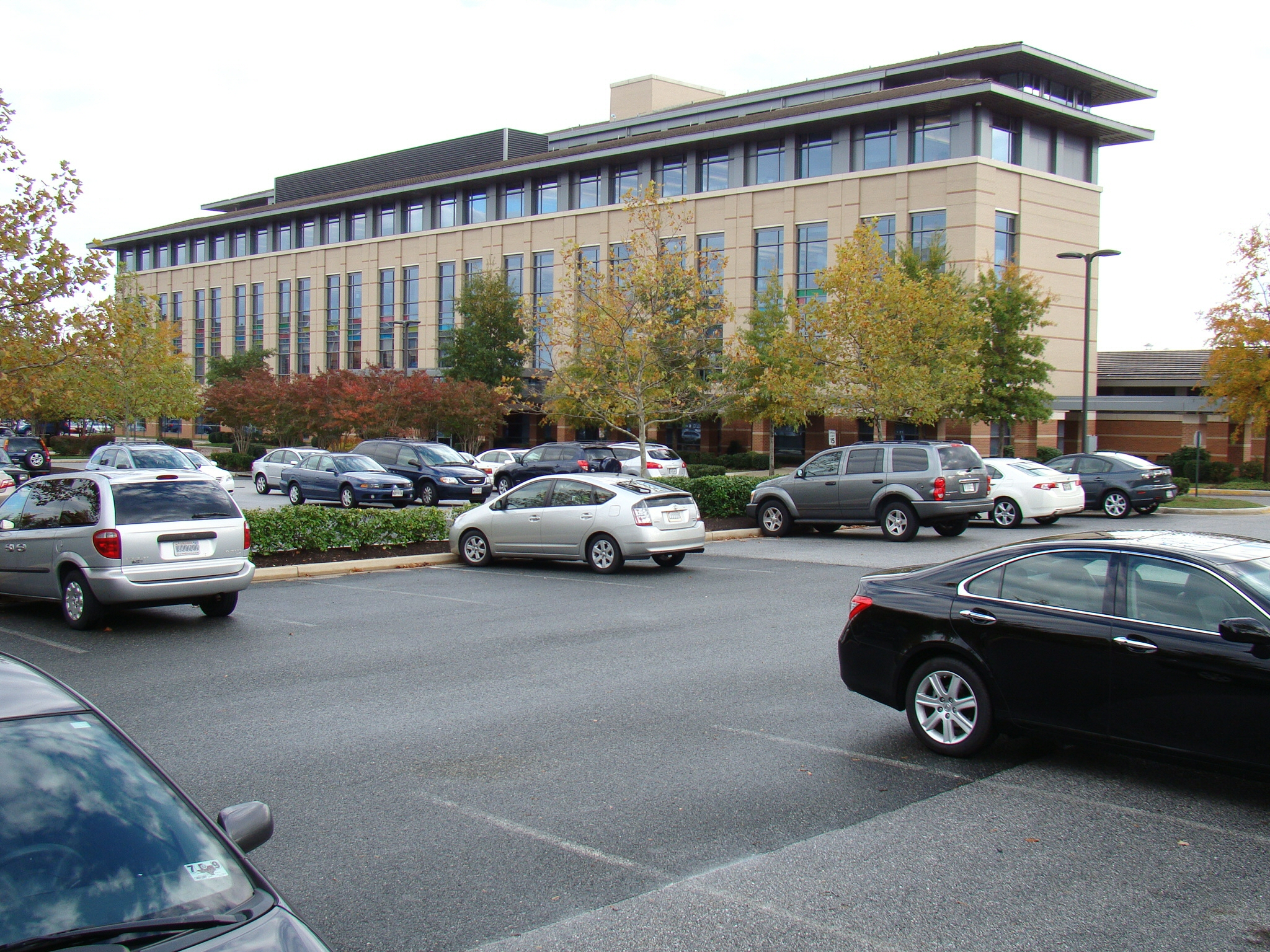
- J. Craig Venter Institute in Rockville, Maryland
- Founder: J. Craig Venter
- Established: September 2004; 22 years ago
- Location: Rockville, Maryland
- Coordinates: 32.869107°N 117.243037°W
- Interactive map of J. Craig Venter Institute (JCVI)
- Website: www.jcvi.org

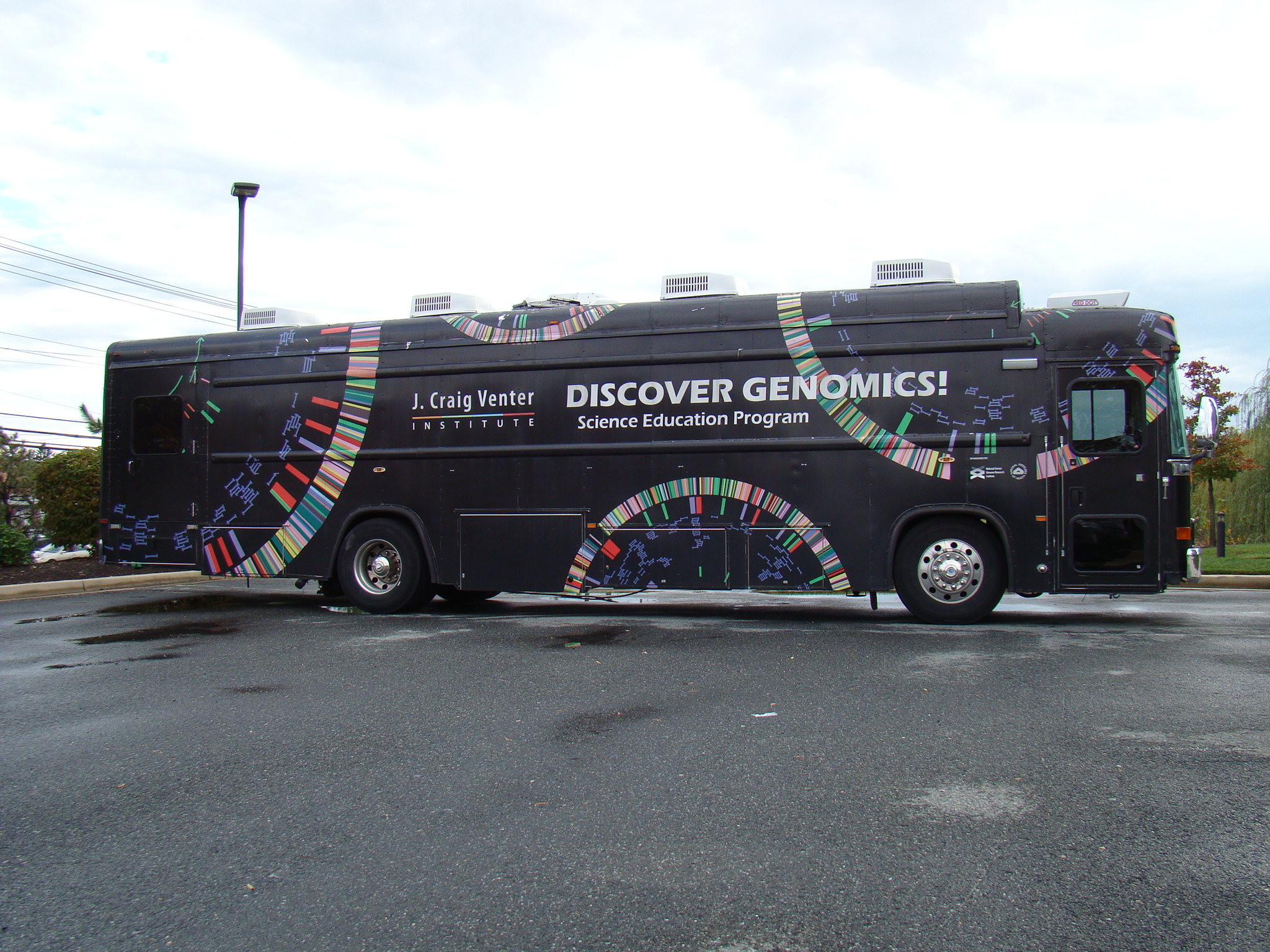
Educational Bus near J. Craig Venter Institute in Rockville

The J. Craig Venter Institute (JCVI) is a nonprofit genomics research institute founded by J. Craig Venter, Ph.D. in September 2004. The institute was the result of consolidating four organizations: the Center for the Advancement of Genomics, The Institute for Genomic Research (TIGR), the Institute for Biological Energy Alternatives, and the J. Craig Venter Science Foundation Joint Technology Center. It has facilities in Rockville, Maryland and San Diego, California.

The institute studies the societal implications of genomics in addition to genomics itself. The institute's research involves genomic medicine; environmental genomic analysis; clean energy; synthetic biology; and ethics, law, and economics. The institute employs over 200 people, including Nobel laureate Hamilton Smith. It was sold to the University of California, San Diego, in 2022.

== History ==
In 1992, Craig Venter was a researcher at the National Institutes of Health (NIH). He began The Institute for Genomic Research (TIGR) during the same time and was part of the determination of the human genome. Because of disagreements of how the project was being managed TIGR was excluded from the funding by NIH in 1998. The political, personal, and ethical conflicts of the race between the public and private sectors have been notable.

In 1995, the precursor to the J. Craig Venter Institute, TIGR, determined the sequence of Haemophilus influenzae, Mycoplasma genitalium, and Methanococcus jannaschii. In 1997, TIGR determined the genome of Borrelia burgdorferi (which causes Lyme disease). In 1998, TIGR sequenced the genome of Treponema pallidum (which causes syphilis). In 1999 TIGR published the sequence of the radioresistant polyextremophile Deinococcus radiodurans. TIGR has sequenced and analyzed more than 50 microbial genomes. TIGR developed the gene finder GLIMMER and the sequence alignment program MUMmer. In 2001 anthrax attacks, TIGR worked with the National Science Foundation and the FBI to sequence the strain of Bacillus anthracis used in bioterrorism attacks.

In June 2000, Venter founded The Center for the Advancement of Genomics (TCAG), a think tank for studying the ethics of human genetics and stem cells research.

Also in 2002, Venter founded the Institute for Biological Energy Alternatives (IBEA) to investigate the use of microorganisms to produce alternate fuels (such as hydrogen) and to sequester carbon dioxide. The IBEA began genomic sequencing of environmental microbial populations that might be used. To provide support for these facilities, Venter created the J. Craig Venter Institute Joint Technology Center (JTC), which specialized in high throughput sequencing. To provide administrative and financial support for TIGR, TCAG, IBEA and JTC, Venter created the nonprofit J. Craig Venter Science Foundation (JCVSF) to consolidate activities between its affiliated organizations.

In September 2004, the Center for the Advancement of Genomics (TCAG), the Institute for Biological Energy Alternatives (IBEA) and the J. Craig Venter Institute Joint Technology Center (JTC) were merged to form the J. Craig Venter Institute (JCVI).

In 2007, the institute published the first diploid human genome, i.e. the genome of a single individual (J. Craig Venter) in which both sets of chromosomes were sequenced. In 2010, the institute determined the 1.08 million base pair Mycoplasma mycoides genome, which was then inserted into a cell to create the first cell with a completely synthetic genome.

In April 2022 Venter sold the La Jolla facility to the University of California, San Diego for $25 million. The university, which already has a very strong genomics program, hopes to absorb most of the institute's faculty and its current research grants. Venter continued to lead a separate nonprofit research group, also known as the J. Craig Venter Institute.

== See also ==
- Artificial cell – Engineered component of a biological cell
- Global Ocean Sampling Expedition – Project to assess marine genetic diversity
- Mycoplasma laboratorium – Bacterium with synthetic genome
- Synthetic mycoides
