= J. Craig Venter =

American geneticist (1946–2026)

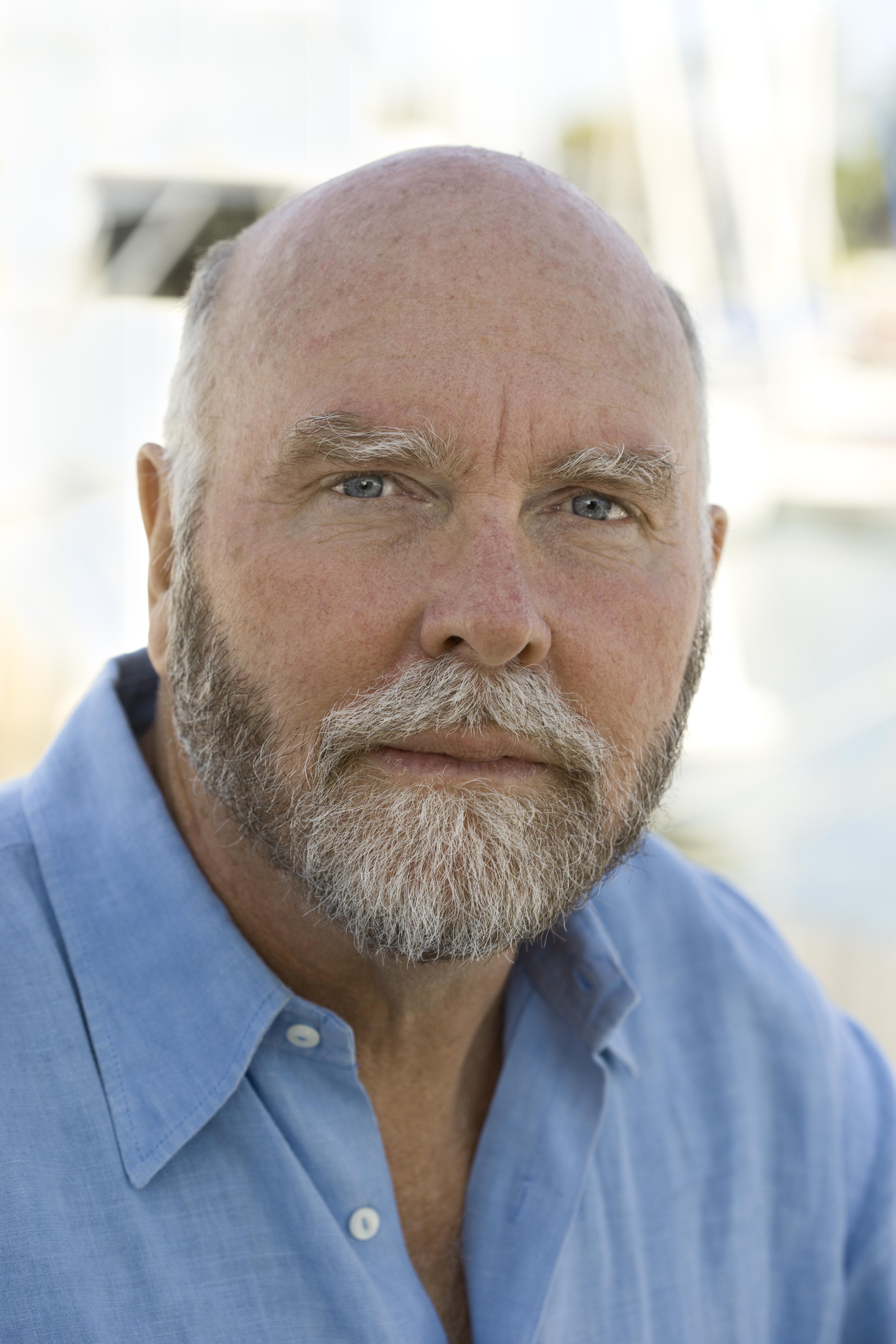
- Venter in 2007
- Born: John Craig Venter; October 14, 1946; Salt Lake City, Utah, U.S.
- Died: April 29, 2026 (aged 79); San Diego, California, U.S.
- Education: University of California, San Diego (BS, PhD)
- Occupation: Biologist
- Spouses: Barbara Rae (m. 1968; sep. 1980): Claire M. Fraser (div. 2005); Heather Kowalski (m. 2008)
- Children: 1
- Awards: Gairdner Award (2002); Nierenberg Prize (2007); Kistler Prize (2008); ENI award (2008); Medal of Science (2008); Dickson Prize (2011); Leeuwenhoek Medal (2015); Edogawa NICHE Prize (2020)
- Scientific career
- Fields: DNA; Human genome; Metagenomics; Synthetic genomics; Shotgun approach to genome sequencing
- Workplaces: State University of New York at Buffalo; National Institutes of Health; J. Craig Venter Institute
- Thesis: Immobilized and insolubilized drugs, hormones and enzymes: characterizations and applications to physiology and medicine (1975)
- Doctoral advisor: Nathan O. Kaplan
- Doctoral students: Claire M. Fraser
- Venter's voice Speech on the draft completion of the Human Genome Project; Recorded June 26, 2000
- Website: www.jcvi.org

John Craig Venter (October 14, 1946 – April 29, 2026) was an American geneticist and businessman. He is known for having led one of the first draft sequences of the human genome and led the first team to transfect a cell with a synthetic chromosome. Venter founded Celera Genomics, the Institute for Genomic Research (TIGR) and the J. Craig Venter Institute (JCVI). He was the co-founder of Human Longevity Inc., and Synthetic Genomics.

Venter was listed on Time magazine's 2007 and 2008 Time 100 lists of the most influential people in the world. In 2010, the British magazine New Statesman listed him as 14th in the list of "The World's 50 Most Influential Figures 2010". In 2012, Venter was honored with the Dan David Prize for his contribution to genome research. He was elected to the American Philosophical Society in 2013. He was a member of the USA Science and Engineering Festival's advisory board.

== Early life and education ==
John Craig Venter was born in Salt Lake City, Utah, on October 14, 1946, the son of Elisabeth and John Venter. His family moved to Millbrae, California, during his childhood. In his youth, he did not take his education seriously, preferring to spend his time on the water in boats or surfing. According to his autobiography, A Life Decoded, he was never a highly engaged student, having Cs and Ds on his eighth-grade report cards.

Venter considered that his behavior in his adolescence was indicative of attention deficit hyperactivity disorder (ADHD), and later found ADHD-linked genetic variants in his own DNA. He graduated from Mills High School. His father died suddenly at age 59 from cardiac arrest, giving him a lifelong awareness of his own mortality. He quoted a saying: "If you want immortality, do something meaningful with your life."

He opposed the Vietnam War, but enlisted in the United States Navy to avoid being drafted. He trained as a medic and worked as a hospital corpsman in the intensive-care ward of a field hospital at Naval Support Activity Danang in Vietnam for a year in 1967–68. Stressed by the intensity of the Tet Offensive, he attempted suicide by swimming out to sea, but came to his senses and swam back to shore. Treating thousands of injured soldiers instilled in him a desire to study medicine.

He began his college education in 1969 at a community college, College of San Mateo in California, and later transferred to the University of California, San Diego, where he studied under biochemist Nathan O. Kaplan. He received a Bachelor of Science degree in biochemistry in 1972 and a Ph.D. in physiology and pharmacology in 1975 from UCSD.

== Career ==
After working as an associate professor, and later as full professor, at the State University of New York at Buffalo, he joined the National Institutes of Health (NIH) in 1984.

=== EST controversy ===
While an employee of the NIH, Venter learned how to identify mRNA and began to learn more about how it is expressed in the human brain. The short cDNA sequence fragments Venter discovered by automated DNA sequencing, he named expressed sequence tags, or ESTs. The NIH Office of Technology Transfer decided to file a patent on the ESTs discovered by Venter, patenting the genes identified based on studies of mRNA expression in the human brain. When Venter disclosed the NIH strategy during a Congressional hearing, a firestorm of controversy erupted. The NIH later stopped the effort and abandoned the patent applications it had filed, following public outcry.

=== Human Genome Project ===
Venter was passionate about the power of genomics to transform healthcare radically. Venter believed that whole genome shotgun sequencing was the fastest and most effective way to get useful human genome data. However, the method was rejected by the Human Genome Project, since some geneticists felt it would not be accurate enough for a genome as complicated as that of humans, that it would be logistically more difficult, and that it would cost significantly more.

He viewed the slow pace of progress in the Human Genome Project as an opportunity to continue his interest in trying his shotgun sequencing method to speed up human genome sequencing, so he sought funding from the private sector to start Celera Genomics. The company planned to profit from their work by creating genomic data to which users could subscribe for a fee. The goal consequently put pressure on the public genome program and spurred several groups to redouble their efforts to produce the full sequence. Venter's effort won him renown as he and his team at Celera Corporation shared credit for sequencing the first draft human genome with the publicly funded Human Genome Project.

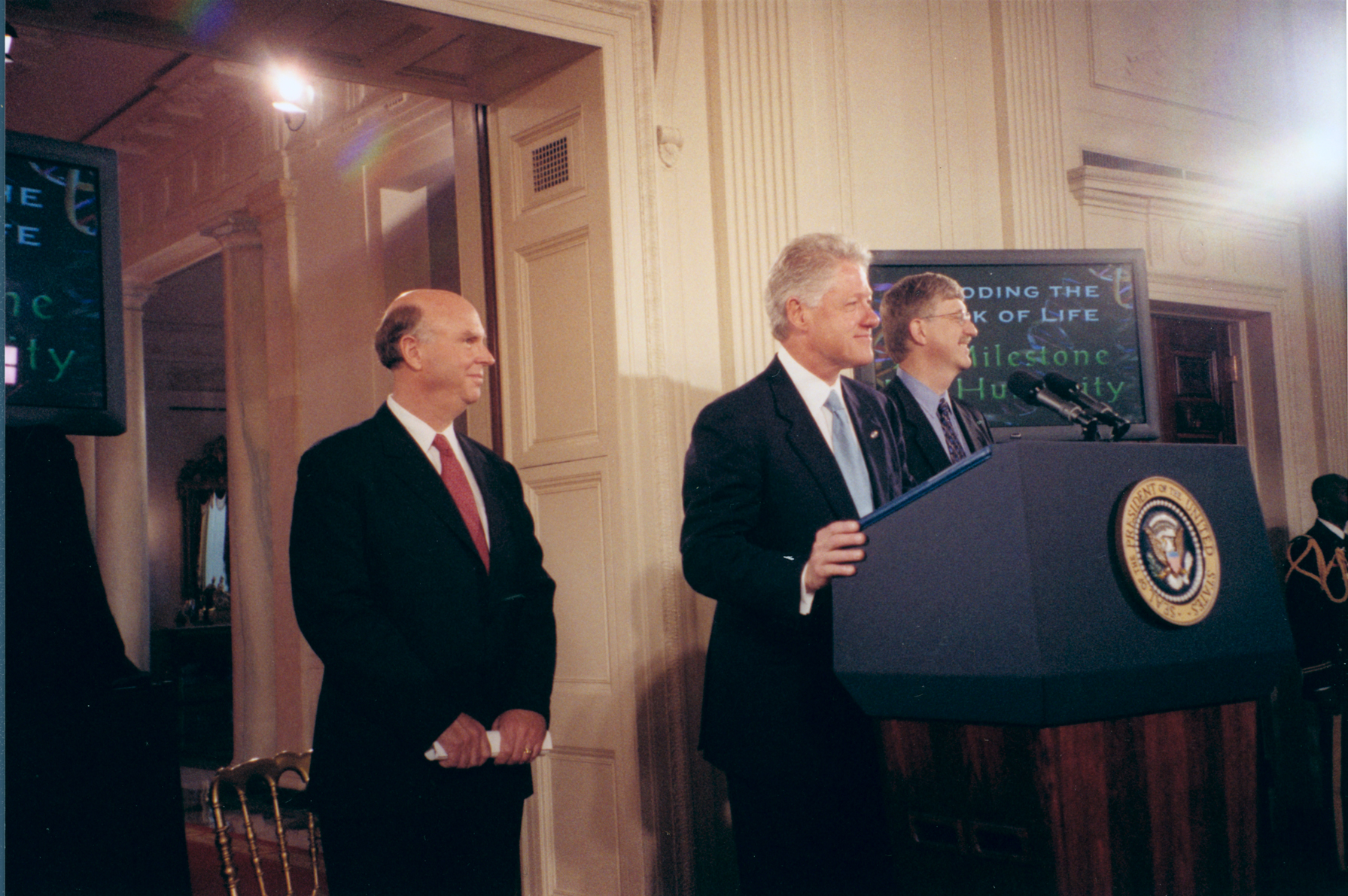
Craig Venter (left), President Bill Clinton and Francis Collins on announcing the draft completion of the Human Genome Project in June 2000

In 2000, Venter and Francis Collins of the National Institutes of Health and U.S. Public Genome Project jointly made the announcement of the mapping of the human genome, a full three years ahead of the expected end of the Public Genome Program. The announcement was made along with U.S. President Bill Clinton, and UK Prime Minister Tony Blair. Venter and Collins thus shared an award for "Biography of the Year" from A&E Network. On February 15, 2001, the Human Genome Project consortium published the first Human Genome in the journal Nature, followed one day later by a Celera publication in Science. Despite some claims that shotgun sequencing was in some ways less accurate than the clone-by-clone method chosen by the Human Genome Project, the technique became widely accepted by the scientific community.

Venter was fired by Celera in early 2002. According to his biography, Venter was fired because of a conflict with the main investor, Tony White, specifically barring him from attending the White House ceremony celebrating the achievement of sequencing the human genome. White was sidelined at the ceremony and the presentation of the result as a tie weakened Celera's claims. White wanted to monetize the achievement by turning Celera into a pharmaceutical company but Venter was not interested in that, had no experience of that business and so was dispensable.

=== Global Ocean Sampling Expedition ===
The Global Ocean Sampling Expedition (GOS) is an ocean exploration genome project with the goal of assessing the genetic diversity in marine microbial communities and to understand their role in nature's fundamental processes. Begun as a Sargasso Sea pilot sampling project in August 2003, the full Expedition was announced by Venter on March 4, 2004. The project, which used Venter's personal yacht, Sorcerer II, started in Halifax, Canada, circumnavigated the globe and returned to the U.S. in January 2006.

=== Synthetic Genomics ===
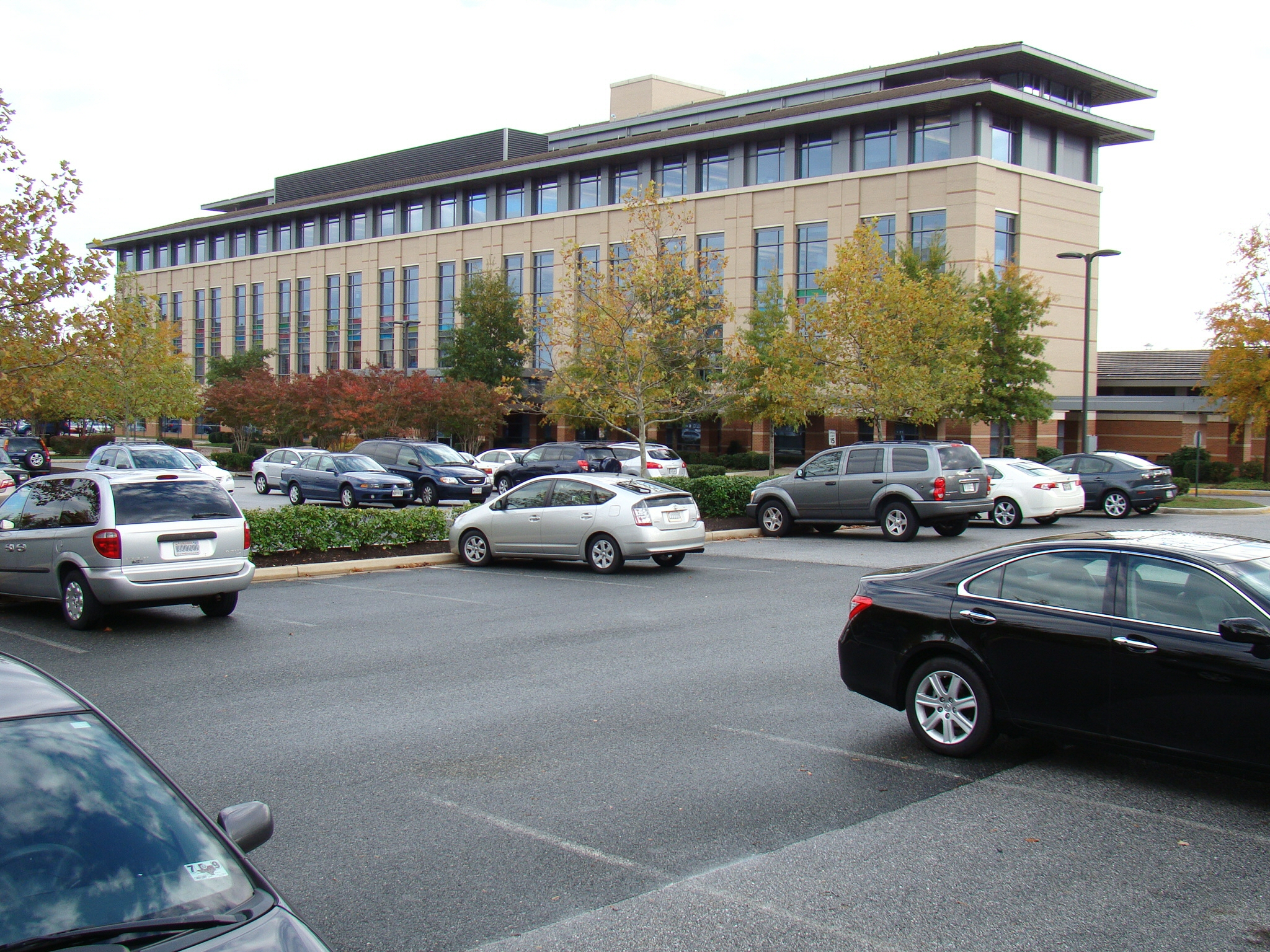
J. Craig Venter Institute, Rockville, Maryland, location

In June 2005, Venter co-founded Synthetic Genomics, a firm dedicated to using modified microorganisms to produce clean fuels and biochemicals. In July 2009, ExxonMobil announced a $600 million collaboration with Synthetic Genomics to research and develop next-generation biofuels. Venter continued to work on the development of engineered diatomic microalgae for the production of biofuels.

Venter sought a patent for the first partially synthetic species possibly to be named Mycoplasma laboratorium. There is speculation that this line of research could have led to the production of bacteria that are engineered to perform specific reactions, for example, produce fuels, make medicines or combat global warming.

In May 2010, a team of scientists led by Venter became the first to produce successfully what was described as "synthetic life". This was done by synthesizing a very long DNA molecule containing an entire bacterium genome, and introducing this into another cell, analogous to the accomplishment of Eckard Wimmer's group, who synthesized and ligated an RNA virus genome and "booted" it in cell lysate. The single-celled organism contains four "watermarks" written into its DNA to identify it as synthetic and to help trace its descendants. These watermarks include:

1. Code table for entire alphabet with punctuation
2. Names of 46 contributing scientists
3. Three quotations
4. The secret email address for the cell

On March 25, 2016, Venter reported the formation of Syn 3.0, a synthetic genome having the fewest genes of any freely living organism (473 genes). Their aim was to strip away all nonessential genes, leaving only the minimal set necessary to support life. This stripped-down, fast reproducing cell is expected to be a valuable tool for researchers in the field.

In August 2018, Venter retired as chairman of the board, saying he wanted to focus on his work at the J. Craig Venter Institute. He remained as a scientific adviser to the board.

=== J. Craig Venter Institute ===
In 2006, Venter founded the J. Craig Venter Institute (JCVI), a nonprofit which conducts research in synthetic biology. It has facilities in La Jolla and in Rockville, Maryland, and employs over 200 people.

In April 2022, Venter sold the La Jolla JCVI facility to the University of California, San Diego, for $25 million. Venter continued to lead a separate nonprofit research group, also known as the J. Craig Venter Institute, and stressed that he was not retiring. With multiple new facility hires, the Venter Institute outgrew its building and in 2025 moved into a new space .

=== Individual human genome ===
On September 4, 2007, a team led by Sam Levy published one of the first genomes of an individual human—Venter's own DNA sequence. Some of the sequences in Venter's genome are associated with wet earwax, increased risk of antisocial behavior, Alzheimer's, and cardiovascular diseases.

The Human Reference Genome Browser is a web application for the navigation and analysis of Venter's genome. The HuRef database consists of approximately 32 million DNA reads sequenced using microfluidic Sanger sequencing, assembled into 4,528 scaffolds and 4.1 million DNA variations identified by genome analysis. These variants include single-nucleotide polymorphisms (SNPs), block substitutions, short and large indels, and structural variations like insertions, deletions, inversions, and copy number changes.

The browser enabled scientists to navigate the HuRef genome assembly and sequence variations, and to compare it with the NCBI human build 36 assembly in the context of the NCBI and Ensembl annotations. The browser provides a comparative view between NCBI and HuRef consensus sequences, the sequence multi-alignment of the HuRef assembly, Ensembl and dbSNP annotations, HuRef variants, and the underlying variant evidence and functional analysis. The interface also represents the haplotype blocks from which diploid genome sequence can be inferred and the relation of variants to gene annotations. The display of variants and gene annotations are linked to external public resources including dbSNP, Ensembl, Online Mendelian Inheritance in Man (OMIM), and Gene Ontology (GO).

Users can search the HuRef genome using HUGO gene names, Ensembl, and dbSNP identifiers, HuRef contig or scaffold locations, or NCBI chromosome locations. Users can then browse any genomic region via the simple and intuitive pan and zoom controls; furthermore, data relevant to specific loci can be exported for further analysis.

=== Human Longevity, Inc. ===
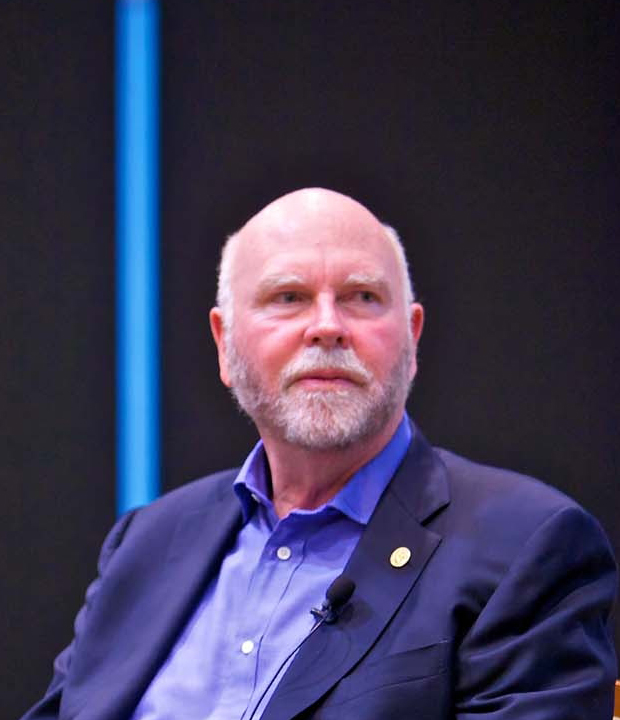
Venter in 2011

On March 4, 2014, Venter and co-founders Peter Diamandis and Robert Hariri announced the formation of Human Longevity, Inc., a company focused on extending the healthy, "high performance" human lifespan. At the time of the announcement, the company had already raised $70 million in venture financing, which was expected to last 18 months. Venter served as the chairman and chief executive officer (CEO) until May 2018, when he retired. The company planned to sequence 40,000 genomes per year, with an initial focus on cancer genomes and the genomes of cancer patients.

In 2016, Venter was screened using diagnostic methods developed by the company. A prostate cancer tumor was found, which had been missed by conventional PSA testing. The tumor was successfully removed by surgery.

Human Longevity filed a lawsuit in 2018 against Venter, accusing him of stealing trade secrets. Allegations were made stating that Venter had departed with his company computer that contained valuable information that could be used to start a competing business. The lawsuit was ultimately dismissed by a California judge on the basis that Human Longevity was unable to present a case that met the legal threshold required for a company, or individual, to sue when its trade secrets have been stolen.

Human Longevity's mission is to extend healthy human lifespan by the use of high-resolution big data diagnostics from genomics, metabolomics, microbiomics, and proteomics, and the use of stem cell therapy.

== Published books ==
Venter was the author of three books, the first of which is an autobiography titled A Life Decoded. In Venter's second book, Life at the Speed of Light, he announced his theory that this is the generation in which there appears to be a dovetailing of the two previously diverse fields of science represented by computer programming and the genetic programming of life by DNA sequencing. He was applauded for his position on this by futurist Ray Kurzweil. Venter's most recent book, co-authored by David Ewing Duncan, The Voyage of Sorcerer II: The Expedition that Unlocked the Secrets of the Ocean's Microbiome, details the Global Ocean Sampling Expedition, spanning a 15-year period during which microbes from the world's oceans were collected and their DNA sequenced.

== Personal life ==
Venter was married to Barbara Rae-Venter for 12 years. They had a son together, Christopher. He then married Claire M. Fraser and remained married to her until 2005. In late 2008, he married Heather Kowalski, and they lived in the La Jolla neighborhood of San Diego, California. Venter was an atheist.

Venter was 75 when he sold his main research building to UCSD in 2022 for $25 million. The institute had outgrown the space and, in May 2025, it was announced that it would be moving to a new facility in downtown San Diego. The Venter Institute campus in Rockville, Maryland, also expanded. In 2022 he said he had no intention of retiring. Besides his home in La Jolla, he had a ranch in Borrego Springs, California, as well as homes in two small towns in Maine. He participated in sailing and flying a Cirrus SR22T plane, which he called "the ultimate freedom".

Venter died in San Diego, California, on April 29, 2026, at the age of 79. He had been hospitalized due to the side effects of the treatment of a recently diagnosed cancer.

== Legacy ==
Venter is considered by his peers to have been a pioneer and maverick of genetic sequencing. He is credited with the shotgun sequencing method that has since helped reduce the time and cost for sequencing. By entering the Human Genome Project at a late stage yet pushing forward quickly with his commercial ties, Venter helped to bring the Project to public attention and make the results of the Project freely available to expand medical research. Venter is also considered a forerunner in the field of synthetic biology with the work he did at his institute.

Venter has been the subject of articles in several magazines, including Wired, The Economist, Australian science magazine Cosmos, and The Atlantic. Venter and his work were part of the focus of the 2001 NOVA special, "Cracking the code of life". Venter was featured in Time magazine's "The Top 10 Everything of 2008" article. Number three in 2008's Top 10 Scientific Discoveries was a piece outlining his work stitching together the 582,000 base pairs necessary to invent the genetic information for a whole new bacterium.

=== Awards and nominations ===
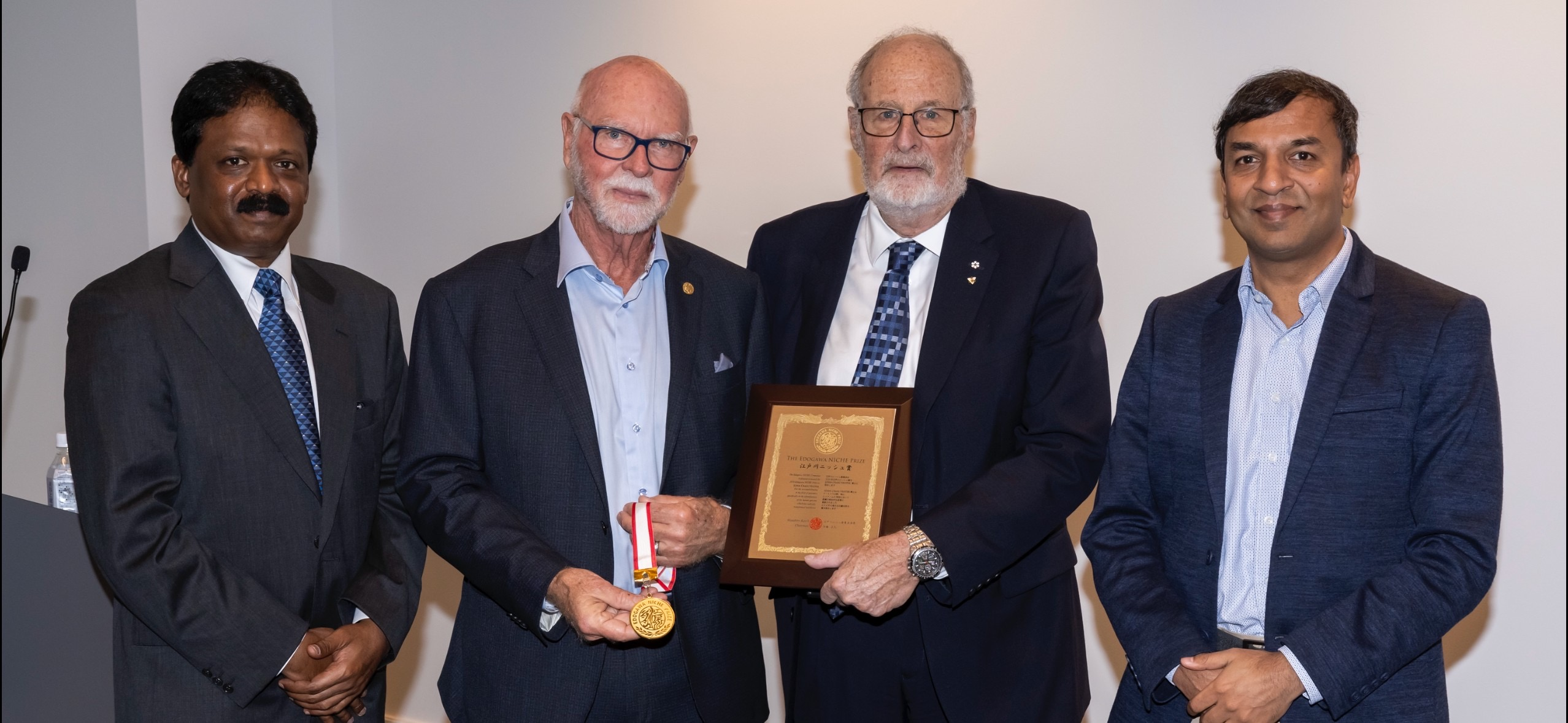
Dr. Craig Venter, being awarded the 2020 Edogawa NICHE Prize in Toronto

- 1996: Golden Plate Award of the American Academy of Achievement
- 1999: Newcomb Cleveland Prize
- 2000: Jacob Heskel Gabbay Award in Biotechnology and Medicine
- 2001: Biotechnology Heritage Award with Francis Collins, from the Biotechnology Industry Organization (BIO) and the Chemical Heritage Foundation
- 2002: Association for Molecular Pathology Award for Excellence in Molecular Diagnostics
- 2002: Canada Gairdner International Award
- 2007: Nierenberg Prize for Science in the Public Interest
- 2007: On May 10, 2007, Venter was awarded an honorary doctorate from Arizona State University, and on October 24 of the same year, he received an honorary doctorate from Imperial College London.
- 2008: Double Helix Medal from Cold Spring Harbor Laboratory
- 2008: Kistler Prize from Foundation For the Future for genome research
- 2008: ENI award for Research & Environment
- 2008: National Medal of Science from President Obama
- 2010: On May 8, 2010, Venter received an honorary doctor of science degree from Clarkson University for his work on the human genome.
- 2011: On April 21, 2011, Venter received the 2011 Benjamin Rush Medal from William & Mary School of Law.
- 2011: Dickson Prize in Medicine
- 2015: Leeuwenhoek Medal
- 2020: Edogawa NICHE Prize for his contribution to research and development pertaining to the Human genome

== Works ==
Venter authored over 200 publications in scientific journals.

- Fleischmann, Robert D.; Adams, Mark D.; White, Owen; Clayton, Rebecca; ... Venter, J. Craig (July 28, 1995). "Whole-Genome Random Sequencing and Assembly of Haemophilus influenzae Rd". Science. 269 (5223): 496–512. Bibcode:1995Sci...269..496F. doi:10.1126/science.7542800. PMID 7542800. S2CID 10423613.
- Tomb, Jean-F.; White, Owen; Kerlavage, Anthony R.; Clayton, Rebecca A.; Sutton, Granger G.; Fleischmann, Robert D.; ... Venter, J. Craig (August 7, 1997). "The complete genome sequence of the gastric pathogen Helicobacter pylori". Nature. 388 (6642): 539–47. Bibcode:1997Natur.388..539T. doi:10.1038/41483. PMID 9252185.
- Adams, Mark D.; Celniker, Susan E.; Holt, Robert A.; Evans, Cheryl A.; Goccayne, Jeannine A.; Amanatides, Peter G.; ... Venter, J. Craig (March 24, 2000). "The genome sequence of Drosophila melanogaster" (PDF). Science. 287 (5461): 2185–95. Bibcode:2000Sci...287.2185.. doi:10.1126/science.287.5461.2185. PMID 10731132. Archived from the original (PDF) on July 22, 2018.
- Venter, J. C.; Adams, M.; Myers, E.; Li, P.; Mural, R.; Sutton, G.; Smith, H.; Yandell, M.; Evans, C.; Holt, R. A.; Gocayne, J. D.; Amanatides, P.; Ballew, R. M.; Huson, D. H.; Wortman, J. R.; Zhang, Q.; Kodira, C. D.; Zheng, X. H.; Chen, L.; Skupski, M.; Subramanian, G.; Thomas, P. D.; Zhang, J.; Gabor Miklos, G. L.; Nelson, C.; Broder, S.; Clark, A. G.; Nadeau, J.; McKusick, V. A.; et al. (2001). "The Sequence of the Human Genome". Science. 291 (5507): 1304–1351. Bibcode:2001Sci...291.1304V. doi:10.1126/science.1058040. PMID 11181995.
- Venter, J. C.; Remington, K.; Heidelberg, J.; Halpern, A.; Rusch, D.; Eisen, J.; Wu, D.; Paulsen, I.; Nelson, K.; Nelson, W.; Fouts, D. E.; Levy, S.; Knap, A. H.; Lomas, M. W.; Nealson, K.; White, O.; Peterson, J.; Hoffman, J.; Parsons, R.; Baden-Tillson, H.; Pfannkoch, C.; Rogers, Y. H.; Smith, H. O. (2004). "Environmental Genome Shotgun Sequencing of the Sargasso Sea". Science. 304 (5667): 66–74. Bibcode:2004Sci...304...66V. doi:10.1126/science.1093857. PMID 15001713. S2CID 1454587.
- Rusch, Donald B.; Halpern, Aaron L.; Sutton, Granger; Heidelberg, Karla B.; Williamson, Shannon; Yooseph, Shibu; Wu, Dongying; ... Venter, J. Craig (March 13, 2007). "The Sorcerer II Global Ocean Sampling expedition: Northwest Atlantic through Eastern Tropical Pacific". PLOS Biology. 5 (3): 398–431. doi:10.1371/journal.pbio.0050077. PMC 1821060. PMID 17355176.
- Yooseph, Shibu; Sutton, Granger; Rusch, Donald B.; Halpern, Aaron L.; Williamson, Shannon; Remington, Karin; Eisen, Jonathan A.; ... Venter, J. Craig (March 13, 2007). "The Sorcerer II Global Ocean Sampling Expedition: Expanding the Universe of Protein Families". PLOS Biology. 5 (3): 432–466. doi:10.1371/journal.pbio.0050016. PMC 1821046. PMID 17355171.
- Venter, J. Craig (2007). A Life Decoded: My Genome: My Life. New York: Viking Adult. ISBN 978-0-670-06358-1. OCLC 165048736. editor Roger Highfield
- Venter, J. Craig (2013). Life at the Speed of Light: From the Double Helix to the Dawn of Digital Life. New York: Viking Adult. ISBN 978-0-670-02540-4. OCLC 834432832. editor Roger Highfield

== See also ==
- Artificial gene synthesis
- Full genome sequencing
- Genetic testing
- Genome: The Autobiography of a Species in 23 Chapters
- Personal genomics
- Pharmacogenomics
- Predictive medicine
- Synthetic Organism Designer
