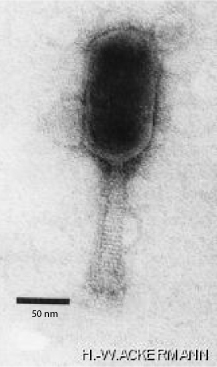
- Electron micrograph of a virion of species Schizotequattrovirus

Virus classification
- (unranked): Virus
- Realm: Duplodnaviria
- Kingdom: Heunggongvirae
- Phylum: Uroviricota
- Class: Caudoviricetes
- Order: Pantevenvirales
- Family: Straboviridae
- Genus: Schizotequatrovirus

Species
- Schizotequatrovirus KVP40; Schizotequatrovirus valkk3; Schizotequatrovirus vh7d

Synonyms
- Schizot4likevirus; Schizot4virus

= Schizotequatrovirus =

Genus of viruses

Schizotequatrovirus (formerly Schizot4virus) is a genus of viruses in the family Straboviridae, in the class Caudoviricetes,. Bacteria serve as natural hosts. There are three species in this genus.

== Taxonomy ==
The following list is a map of T4virus species according to ICTV Version 2022

- Class: Caudoviricetes
  - Order: Pantevenvirales
    - Family: Straboviridae
      - Genus: Schizotequatrovirus
        - Schizotequatrovirus KVP40
        - Schizotequatrovirus valkk3
        - Schizotequatrovirus vh7d

== Structure ==
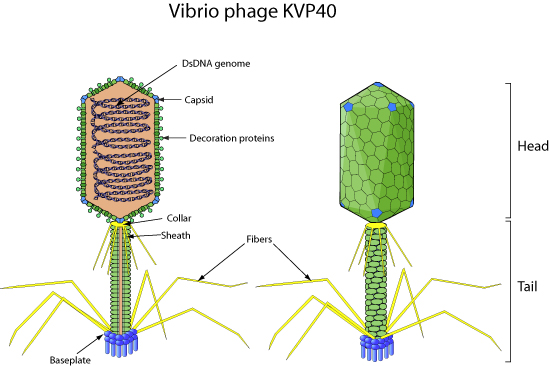
Schematic drawing of a virion of Vibrio virus KVP40 (cross section and side view)

The virions of Schizotequatrovirus are nonenveloped, with a head and tail. The head is a prolate spheroid approximately 140 nm in length and 70 nm in width. The tail is around 140 nm long, has 6 long terminal fibers, 6 short spikes, and a small base plate. The tail is enclosed in a sheath, which loosens and slides around the tail core upon contraction.

Genus	Structure	Symmetry	Capsid	Genomic arrangement	Genomic segmentation
Schizotequatrovirus	Head-Tail	T=13 Q=21	Non-enveloped	Linear	Monopartite

== Genome ==
Genomes are linear. All three species have been fully sequenced. They range between 244k and 248k nucleotides, with 381 to 405 proteins. The complete genomes are available from National Center for Biotechnology Information (NCBI), along with the complete genome for Vibrio phage VH7D, an unclassified virus strain.

== Life cycle ==
Viral replication is cytoplasmic. The virus attaches to the host cell using its terminal fibers, and uses viral exolysin to degrade the cell wall enough to eject the viral DNA into the host cytoplasm via contraction of its tail sheath. DNA-templated transcription is the method of transcription. Once the viral genes have been replicated, the procapsid is assembled and packed. The tail is then assembled and the mature virions are released via lysis. Bacteria serve as the natural host. Transmission routes are passive diffusion.

Genus	Host details	Tissue tropism	Entry details	Release details	Replication site	Assembly site	Transmission
Schizotequatrovirus	Bacteria	None	Injection	Lysis	Cytoplasm	Cytoplasm	Passive diffusion

== History ==
According to ICTV's 2010–11 report, the genus Schizot4likevirus was first accepted as a new genus, at the same time as its type species Vibrio phage KVP40, as well as its containing subfamily Tevenvirinae. At the same time, Vibrio phage nt-1 was moved into the genus from its previous classification in T4-like viruses (now T4virus). This proposal is available here. In 2015, the genus was renamed to Schizot4virus. In 2019, with Master Species List 34, the genus was renamed again, now to Schizotequatrovirus
