= Enterobacteria phage T6 =

Virus classification
- (unranked): Virus
- Realm: Duplodnaviria
- Kingdom: Heunggongvirae
- Phylum: Uroviricota
- Class: Caudoviricetes
- Order: Pantevenvirales
- Family: Straboviridae
- Genus: Tequatrovirus
- Species: Escherichia virus T4
- Strain: Enterobacteria phage T6

Species of virus

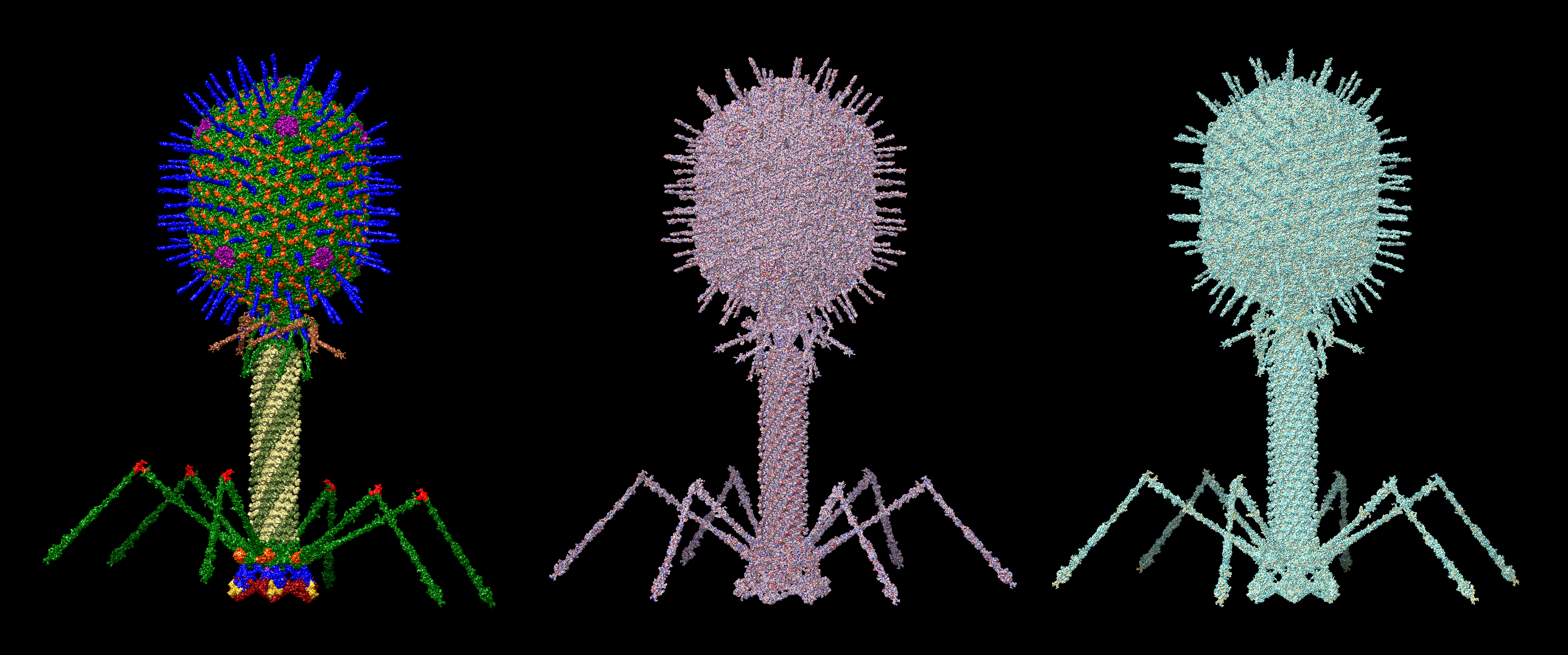
The structure of bacteriophage T6 at atomic resolution is presented here. From left to right: The Chimera software structure is depicted, the Maestro software electrostatics structure is depicted, and the ChimeraX software hydrophilicity structure is depicted in orange-green

Enterobacteria phage T6 is a bacteriophage strain that infects Escherichia coli bacteria. It was one bacteriophage that was used as a model system in the 1950s in exploring the methods viruses replicate, along with the other T-even bacteriophages (which build up virus species Escherichia virus T4, a member of genus T4virus according to ICTV nomenclature): Enterobacteria phage T2, Enterobacteria phage T4 and Enterobacteria phage T2.
