= Bianca Tchoubar =

French-Ukrainian chemist (1910–1990)

- Б'янка Чубар
- Tchoubar in 1957
- Born: 22 October 1910; Kharkiv, Russian Empire
- Died: April 24, 1990 (aged 79); Paris, France
- Known for: Tiffeneau–Demjanov rearrangement
- Scientific career
- Fields: Chemistry
- Workplaces: CNRS
- Thesis: Contribution à l'étude des extensions de cycles. Désamination nitreuse des aminométhyl-1 cyclanols-1 (1946)
- Doctoral advisor: Marc Tiffeneau

Bianca Ilyinichna Tchoubar (Ukrainian: Б'янка Чубар; 22 October 1910 – 24 April 1990) was a French Ukrainian chemist specialising in reaction mechanisms. In her seminal work with Marc Tiffeneau, she discovered the Tiffeneau–Demjanov rearrangement.

== Life ==
=== Early years and education ===
Bianca Ilyinichna Tchoubar was born on 22 October 1910 in Kharkiv, Ukraine, then part of the Russian Empire. Her family were Karaits Jews. Her father, Ilya Tchoubar, was a Kharkiv lawyer closely associated with the local liberal party. To avoid problems resulting from the Bolshevik takeover of Kharkiv, in 1920 the parents and their two children, Bianca and her brother Serhiy, were forced to move. They left Ukraine for Paris, travelling via Constantinople and Budapest.

In 1924, at the age of 14, alongside her brother, Tchoubar began her studies at a Russian school in Paris set up by the authorities for immigrant children from Russia. It was there she developed an interest in chemistry thanks to her teacher Catherine Chamié (sometimes recorded as Chamier), a Russian who had worked with Marie and Pierre Curie. Tchoubar later described Chamié as her "mother in chemistry".

In 1931, Tchoubar earned her bachelor's degree in science at the Sorbonne and in 1932, her Diplôme d'Études Supérieures de Sciences Chimiques, undertaking a Study of molecules and charged particles under her mentor, Professor Paul Freundler.

== Career with Tiffenau ==
Tchoubar was recruited by chemist Marc Tiffeneau when the French National Centre for Scientific Research (CNRS) was set up. In 1934, she published her first research article on the reaction of Grignard reagents with chlorocyclohexanones in the Comptes Rendus de l'Académie de Sciences. In 1937, she became the first woman to be appointed as a research intern at the newly established CNRS, becoming a research assistant in 1945. She investigated molecular rearrangement reactions. Using quantum mechanical theories of bonding, she developed a mechanism for nitrate deamination of alicyclic primary amines. This became known as the mechanism of the Demjanov–Tiffenau–Tchoubar rearrangement, though Tchoubar is often excluded from the name.

During World War II, Tchoubar was involved with the French Resistance; she was a lifelong communist.

Tiffeneau did not always agree with Tchoubar's interpretation of her experimental results. After Tiffeneau died in 1945, Tchoubar turned to Pauline Ramart who needed to approve her doctoral examination committee. Although Ramart accepted the experimental findings, she remained skeptical of the theoretical interpretation. Nevertheless, Ramart appointed Edmond Bauer to chair the doctoral examination. After the war Tchoubar's friend, Jeanne Lévy, was chosen to open a new medical facility in Paris which is known today as the Fournier Institute. Working there in 1946, Tchoubar defended her doctoral thesis "Contribution to the study of cycle extensions. Nitrous deamination of aminomethyl-1 cyclanols-1" (French: Contribution à l'étude des extensions de cycles. Désamination nitreuse des aminométhyl-1 cyclanols-1). Despite the reluctance of Ramart remarks, Bauer was impressed by her ideas. Her thesis was the first research work in France to address organic reaction mechanisms in the light of mesomerism and the formation of charged internediates.

=== Reaction mechanism, CNRS and retirement ===
Tchoubar introduced new ideas in reaction chemistry, became a senior research fellow in 1955 and in 1960 published a compendium entitled Reaction Mechanisms in Organic Chemistry (French: Les Mécanismes réactionnels en chimie organique), which was translated into six languages. The book was nicknamed "la petit Tchoubar" in honour of its usefulness.

Tchoubar was appointed research director at the CNRS and became director of Group No. 12 (GR12) in Thiais. She worked there until her official retirement in 1978.

Post retirement, Tchoubar retained a place in the laboratory and embarked on new areas of research: the effects of solvents on E2/SN2 competitions, and reactions.

From 1974 onwards, and especially after her retirement from management, Tchoubar embarked on research into transition metal chemistry, a field that was new to her. Her research was carried out in close collaboration with the group led by Alexander E. Shilov.

Tchoubar co-authored a book with André Loupy on Les Effets de sels en chimie organique et organométallique in 1988.

Bianca Tchoubar died on 24 April 1990 in the 15th arrondissement of Paris.

== Honours ==
In 2026, Tchoubar was announced as one of 72 historical women in STEM whose names have been proposed to be added to the 72 men already celebrated on the Eiffel Tower. The plan was announced by the Mayor of Paris, Anne Hidalgo following the recommendations of a committee led by Isabelle Vauglin of Femmes et Sciences and Jean-François Martins, representing the operating company which runs the Eiffel Tower.

== Selected publications ==
- Tiffeneau, Marc; Weill, Paul; Tchoubar, Bianca (1937). "Isomérisation de l'oxyde de méthylène cyclohexane en hexahydrobenzaldéhyde et désamination de l'aminoalcool correspondant en cycloheptanone". C. R. Hebd. Séances Acad. Sci. (in French). 205: 54-56. ISSN 0001-4036..
