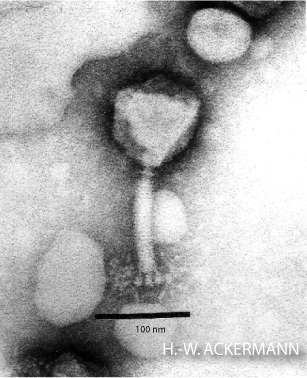
- Electron micrograph of a Kuttervirus virion

Virus classification
- (unranked): Virus
- Realm: Duplodnaviria
- Kingdom: Heunggongvirae
- Phylum: Uroviricota
- Class: Caudoviricetes
- Order: Pantevenvirales
- Family: Ackermannviridae
- Subfamily: Cvivirinae
- Genus: Kuttervirus

Species
- See text

= Kuttervirus =

Genus of viruses

Kuttervirus is a genus of bacteriophages in the family Ackermannviridae. The genus contains 40 species.

== Characterization ==
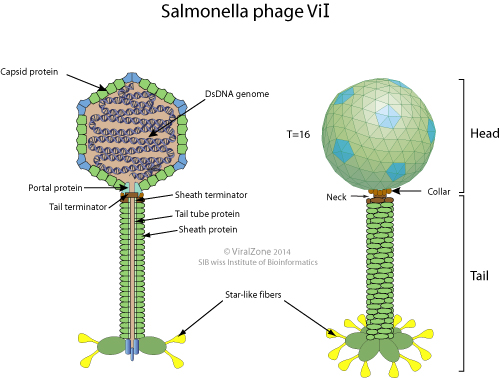
Virion of species Salmonella virus ViI, cross section and side view

The heads of these phages are icosahedral in nature. Their tails are composed of a collared neck (similar in structure to that of a T4 phage), “a sheath surrounding a tail tube or core, a thin base plate, and an adsorption structure” Notably, a series of unique protrusions can be found stemming from the base plate of these organisms. 3 to 4 thick, rounded prongs (located at the bottom of the base plate) and an equal number of thinner, star-like protrusions (attached to the sides of the baseplate via a stalk) have been observed in members of the genus.

Members of the genus are similar in terms of genomics. All species in the genus showed above a 75% commonality in protein composition. While “the gene order is strongly conserved in all seven phages…various functional regions are randomly distributed throughout the genome…”. Functional clustering, as observed in other genera of phages, is uniquely absent from Kuttervirus, and proves to be a defining quality of the genus.

Due to the diversity in tail-spike filaments, researchers have suggested that these phages may be capable of infecting a wider range of hosts. One such example has already been observed: the species SFP10 has successfully infected of the genus Salmonella and of the species E. coli. While all members of the genus possess tail spikes, each species may possess unique spikes, many of which must be further researched to determine their function.

== Taxonomy ==
The genus contains the following species:

- Escherichia virus CBA120
- Escherichia virus ECML4
- Escherichia virus EP75
- Escherichia virus FEC14
- Escherichia virus PhaxI
- Salmonella virus 38
- Salmonella virus aagejoakim
- Salmonella virus allotria
- Salmonella virus barely
- Salmonella virus bering
- Salmonella virus BSP101
- Salmonella virus Det7
- Salmonella virus dinky
- Salmonella virus GG32
- Salmonella virus heyday
- Salmonella virus maane
- Salmonella virus Marshall
- Salmonella virus Maynard
- Salmonella virus moki
- Salmonella virus Mutine
- Salmonella virus pertopsoe
- Salmonella virus PM10
- Salmonella virus rabagast
- Salmonella virus S118
- Salmonella virus SE14
- Salmonella virus SeB
- Salmonella virus SeG
- Salmonella virus SeJ
- Salmonella virus SenALZ1
- Salmonella virus SenASZ3
- Salmonella virus SeSz1
- Salmonella virus SFP10
- Salmonella virus SH19
- Salmonella virus SJ2
- Salmonella virus SJ3
- Salmonella virus SP1
- Salmonella virus SS9
- Salmonella virus STML131
- Salmonella virus STW77
- Salmonella virus ViI
