= Enterobacteria phage T2 =

Virus classification
- (unranked): Virus
- Realm: Duplodnaviria
- Kingdom: Heunggongvirae
- Phylum: Uroviricota
- Class: Caudoviricetes
- Order: Pantevenvirales
- Family: Straboviridae
- Genus: Tequatrovirus
- Species: Escherichia virus T4
- Strain: Enterobacteria phage T2

Strain of virus

The structure of bacteriophage T2 at atomic resolution is presented here. From left to right: The Chimera software structure is depicted, the Maestro software electrostatics structure is depicted, and the ChimeraX software hydrophilicity structure is depicted in orange-green

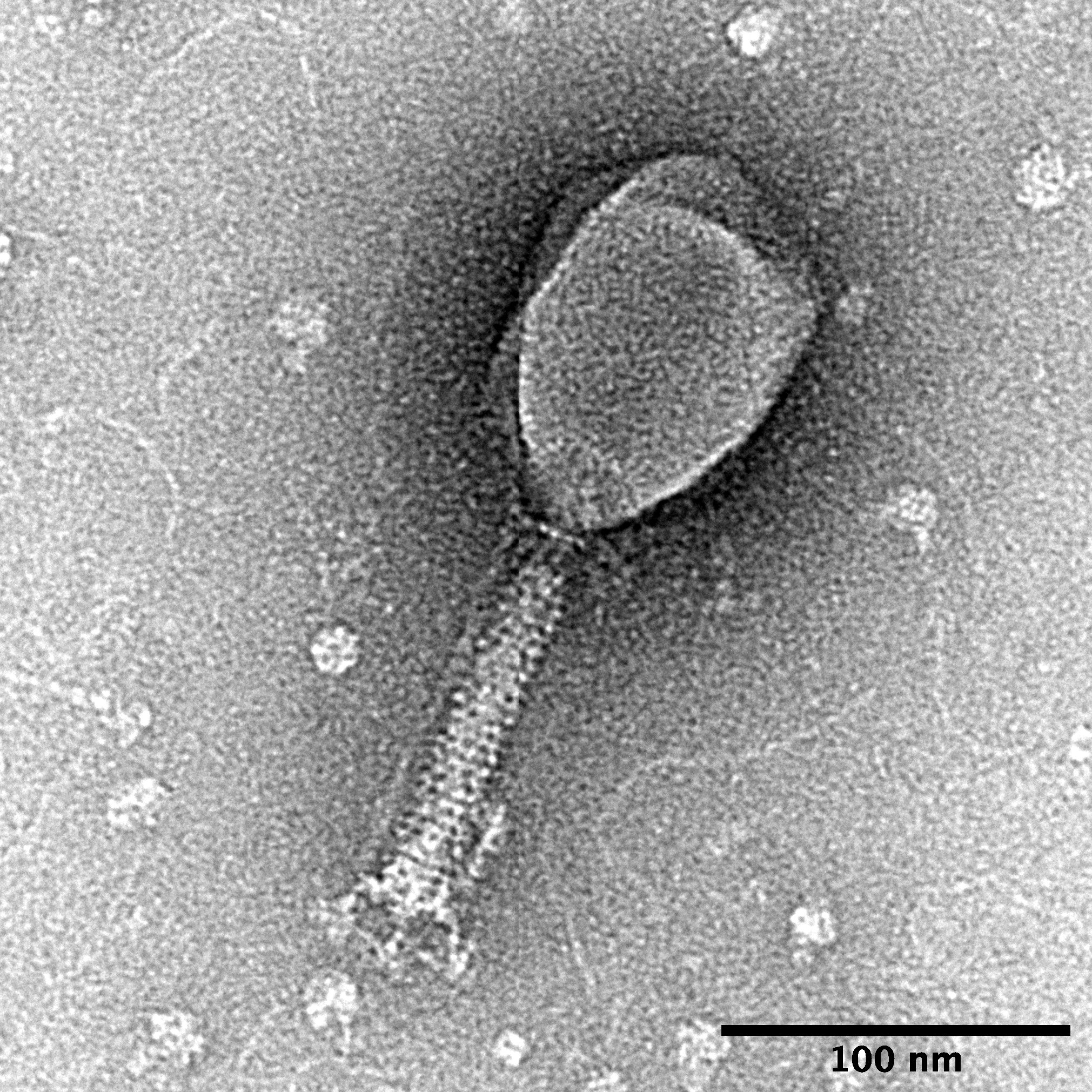
Electron micrograph of T2 bacteriophage

Enterobacteria phage T2 is a virus that infects and kills E. coli. It is in the genus Tequatrovirus, and the family Myoviridae. Its genome consists of linear double-stranded DNA, with repeats at either end. The phage is covered by a protective protein coat.

The T2 phage can quickly turn an E. coli cell into a T2-producing factory that releases phages when the cell ruptures. Experiments conducted in 1952 by Alfred Hershey and Martha Chase demonstrated how the DNA of viruses is injected into the bacterial cells, while most of the viral proteins remain outside. The injected DNA molecules cause the bacterial cells to produce more viral DNA and proteins. These discoveries supported that DNA, rather than proteins, is the hereditary material.

The first phages that were studied in detail included seven that commonly infect E. coli. They were named Type 1 (T1), Type 2 (T2), etc., for easy reference; however, due to structural similarities between the T2, T4, and T6 bacteriophages, these are now commonly referred to as T-Even phages.

The phage can attach to the surface of a bacterium using the proteins on its 'feet' (tail fibers), and inject its genetic material (either DNA or RNA). This genetic material uses the host cell's ribosomes to replicate, and synthesize proteins for the capsid and tail of the phage. New phages are assembled within the cell until the cellular membrane lyses (splits open). The newly made phages are now free to attack more cells. This process is known as the Lytic cycle.
