= Mosig =

Mosig is a German surname. Notable people with the surname include:

- Dirk W. Mosig (born 1943), German-born American psychologist, historian, literary critic, and ordained Zen monk
- Gisela Mosig (1930–2003), German-American molecular biologist

== See also ==
- 22492 Mosig, a minor planet
