= Vibrio virus nt1 =

Mylasvirus persius

Virus classification
- (unranked): Virus
- Realm: Duplodnaviria
- Kingdom: Heunggongvirae
- Phylum: Uroviricota
- Class: Caudoviricetes
- Order: Pantevenvirales
- Family: Straboviridae
- Genus: Mylasvirus
- Species: Mylasvirus persius

Synonyms
- Vibrio virus nt1; Vibrio phage nt-1

Mylasvirus persius (formerly Vibrio virus nt1) is a bacteriophage known to infect Vibrio bacteria. It infects Vibrio natriegens and was originally isolated from a coastal marsh, a frequent habitat of V. natriegens.
