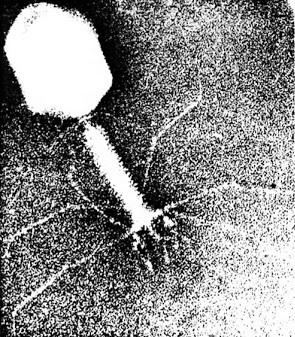
- T4 phage (EM of virion)

Virus classification
- (unranked): Virus
- Realm: Duplodnaviria
- Kingdom: Heunggongvirae
- Phylum: Uroviricota
- Class: Caudoviricetes
- Order: Pantevenvirales
- Family: Straboviridae
- Genus: Tequatrovirus
- Species: Tequatrovirus T4

Strains
- Enterobacteria phage C16; Enterobacteria phage F10; Enterobacteria phage Fs-alpha; Enterobacteria phage PST; Enterobacteria phage SKII; Enterobacteria phage SKV; Enterobacteria phage SKX; Enterobacteria phage SV3; Enterobacteria phage T2; Enterobacteria phage T4; Enterobacteria phage T6

Synonyms
- Enterobacteria phage T4; Escherichia virus T4

= Escherichia virus T4 =

Bacteriophage T4

Species of bacteriophage

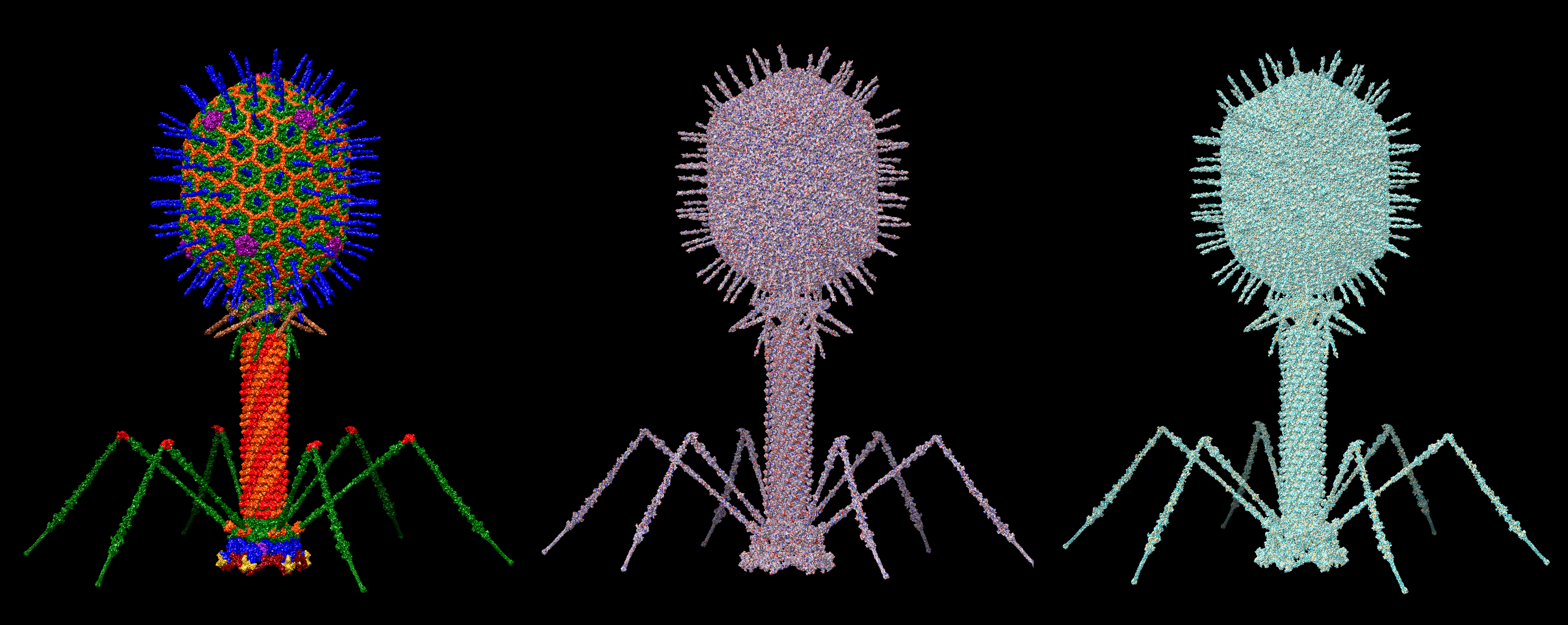
The structure of bacteriophage T4 at atomic resolution is presented here. From left to right: The Chimera software structure is depicted, the Maestro software electrostatics structure is depicted, and the ChimeraX software hydrophilicity structure is depicted in orange-green.

Escherichia virus T4 is a species of bacteriophages that infects Escherichia coli bacteria. It is a double-stranded DNA virus in the subfamily Tevenvirinae of the family Straboviridae. T4 is capable of undergoing only a lytic life cycle and not the lysogenic life cycle. The species was formerly named T-even bacteriophage, a name which also encompasses, among other strains (or isolates), Enterobacteria phage T2, Enterobacteria phage T4 and Enterobacteria phage T6.

== Use in research ==
Dating back to the 1940s and continuing today, T-even phages are considered the best studied model organisms. T-even phages are among the largest and highest complexity virus, being made up of around 300 genes. T-even viruses also use hydroxymethylcytosine (HMC) in place of cytosine as part of their DNA.

== Genome and structure ==
The T4 virus's double-stranded DNA genome is about 169 kbp long and encodes 289 proteins. The T4 genome is terminally redundant. Upon DNA replication, long multi-genome length concatemers are formed, perhaps by a rolling circle mechanism of replication. When packaged, the concatemer is cut at unspecific positions of the same length, leading to several genomes that represent circular permutations of the original. The T4 genome bears eukaryote-like intron sequences.

=== Translation ===
The Shine-Dalgarno sequence GAGG dominates in virus T4 early genes, whereas the sequence GGAG is a target for the T4 endonuclease RegB that initiates the early mRNA degradation.

== Virus particle structure ==
Structural overview of T2 phage

T4 is a relatively large virus, at approximately 90 nm wide and 200 nm long (most viruses range from 25 to 200 nm in length). The DNA genome is held in an icosahedral head, also known as a capsid. The T4's tail is hollow so that it can pass its nucleic acid into the cell it is infecting after attachment. Myoviridae phages like T4 have complex contractile tail structures with a large number of proteins involved in the tail assembly and function. The tail fibres are also important in recognizing host cell surface receptors, so they determine if a bacterium is within the virus's host range.

The structure of the 6 megadalton T4 baseplate that comprises 127 polypeptide chains of 13 different proteins (gene products 5, 5.4, 6, 7, 8, 9, 10, 11, 12, 25, 27, 48 and 53) has recently been described in atomic detail. An atomic model of the proximal region of the tail tube formed by gp54 and the main tube protein gp19 have also been created. The tape measure protein gp29 is present in the baseplate-tail tube complexes, but it could not be modeled.

During assembly of the bacteriophage (phage) T4 virion, the morphogenetic proteins encoded by the phage genes interact with each other in a characteristic sequence. Maintaining an appropriate balance in the amounts of each of these proteins produced during viral infection appears to be critical for normal phage T4 morphogenesis. Phage T4 encoded proteins that determine virion structure include major structural components, minor structural components and non-structural proteins that catalyze specific steps in the morphogenesis sequence. Phage T4 morphogenesis is divided into three independent pathways: the head, the tail and the long tail fibres as detailed by Yap and Rossman.

== Infection process ==
The T4 virus initiates an Escherichia coli infection by binding OmpC porin proteins and lipopolysaccharide (LPS) on the surface of E. coli cells with its long tail fibers (LTF). A recognition signal is sent through the LTFs to the baseplate. This unravels the short tail fibers (STF) that bind irreversibly to the E. coli cell surface. The baseplate changes conformation and the tail sheath contracts, causing GP5 at the end of the tail tube to puncture the outer membrane of the cell. The lysozyme domain of GP5 is activated and degrades the periplasmic peptidoglycan layer. The remaining part of the membrane is degraded and then DNA from the head of the virus can travel through the tail tube and enter the E. coli cell.

In 1952, Hershey and Chase provided key evidence that the phage DNA, as distinct from protein, enters the host bacterial cell upon infection and is thus the genetic material of the phage. This finding suggested that DNA is, in general, the genetic material of different organisms.

=== Reproduction ===
The lytic life cycle (from entering a bacterium to its destruction) takes approximately 30 minutes (at 37 °C). Virulent bacteriophages multiply in their bacterial host immediately after entry. After the number of progeny phages reach a certain amount, they cause the host to lyse or break down, therefore they would be released and infect new host cells. The process of host lyses and release is called the lytic cycle. Lytic cycle is a cycle of viral reproduction that involves the destruction of the infected cell and its membrane. This cycle involves a virus that overtakes the host cell and its machinery to reproduce. Therefore, the virus must go through 5 stages in order to reproduce and infect the host cell:

- Adsorption and penetration (starting immediately)
- Arrest of host gene expression (starting immediately)
- Enzyme synthesis (starting after 5 minutes)
- DNA replication (starting after 10 minutes)
- Formation of new virus particles (starting after 12 minutes)

After the life cycle is complete, the host cell bursts open and ejects the newly built viruses into the environment, destroying the host cell. T4 has a burst size of approximately 100–150 viral particles per infected host.

Benzer (1955 – 1959) developed a system for studying the fine structure of the gene using bacteriophage T4 mutants defective in the rIIA and rIIB genes. The techniques employed were complementation tests and crosses to detect recombination, particularly between deletion mutations. These genetic experiments led to the finding of a unique linear order of mutational sites within the genes. This result provided strong evidence for the key idea that the gene has a linear structure equivalent to a length of DNA with many sites that can independently mutate.

==== Adsorption and penetration ====
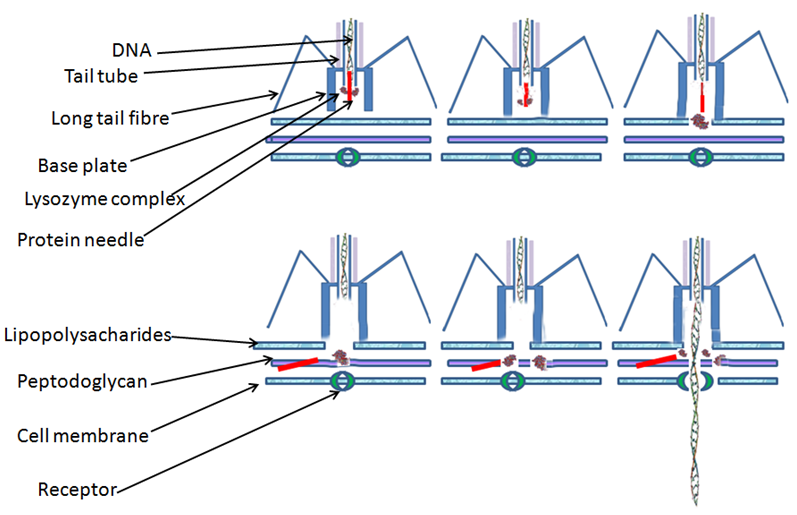
Diagram of the DNA injection process

Just like all other viruses, even phages do not randomly attach to the surface of their host; instead, they "search" and bind to receptors, specific protein structures, found on the surface of the host. These receptors vary with the phage; teichoic acid, cell wall proteins and lipopolysaccharides, flagella, and pili all can serve as receptors for the phage to bind to. For the T-even phage to infect its host and begin its life cycle, it must enter the first process of infection, adsorption of the phage to the bacterial cell. Adsorption is a value characteristic of the phage-host pair, and the adsorption of the phage on the host cell surface is illustrated as a 2-stage process: reversible and irreversible. It involves the phage's tail structure that begins when the phage's tail fibres help bind the phage to the appropriate receptor of its host. This process is reversible. One or more of the components of the base plate mediates the reversible process of binding of the phage to a bacterium.

Penetration is also a value characteristic of phage-host infection that involves the injection of the phages genetic material inside the bacterium. Penetration of nucleic acid takes place after the irreversible adsorption phase. Mechanisms involving penetration of the phage's nucleic acid are specific for each phage. This penetration mechanism can involve electrochemical membrane potential, ATP molecules, enzymatic splitting of peptidoglycan layer, or all three of these factors can be vital for the penetration of the nucleic acid inside the bacterial cell. Studies have been done on the T2 bacteriophage (T4-like phage) mechanism of penetration, and it has been shown that the phage's tail does not penetrate inside the bacterial cell wall, and penetration of this phage involves electrochemical membrane potential on the inner membrane.

== Replication and packaging ==
Virus T4 genome is synthesized within the host cell using rolling circle replication. The time it takes for DNA replication in a living cell was measured as the rate of virus T4 DNA elongation in virus-infected E. coli. During the period of exponential DNA increase at 37 °C, the rate was 749 nucleotides per second. The mutation rate per base pair per replication during virus T4 DNA synthesis is 1.7 per 10^{−8}, a highly accurate DNA copying mechanism, with only 1 error in 300 copies. The virus also codes for unique DNA repair mechanisms. The T4 phage head is assembled empty around a scaffolding protein, which is later degraded. Consequently, the DNA needs to enter the prohead through a tiny pore, which is achieved by a hexamer of gp17 interacting with DNA first, which also serves as a motor and nuclease. The T4 DNA packaging motor has been found to load DNA into virus capsids at a rate up to 2000 base pairs per second. The power involved, if scaled up in size, would be equivalent to that of an average automobile engine.

== Release ==
The final step in viral reproduction and multiplication is determined by the release of virions from the host cell. The release of the virions occurs after the breakage of the bacterial plasma membrane. Nonenveloped viruses lyse the host cell which is characterized by viral proteins attacking the peptidoglycan or membrane. The lysis of the bacteria occurs when the capsids inside the cell release the enzyme lysozyme which break down the cell wall. The released bacteriophages infect other cells, and the viral multiplication cycle is repeated within those cells.

== Multiplicity reactivation ==
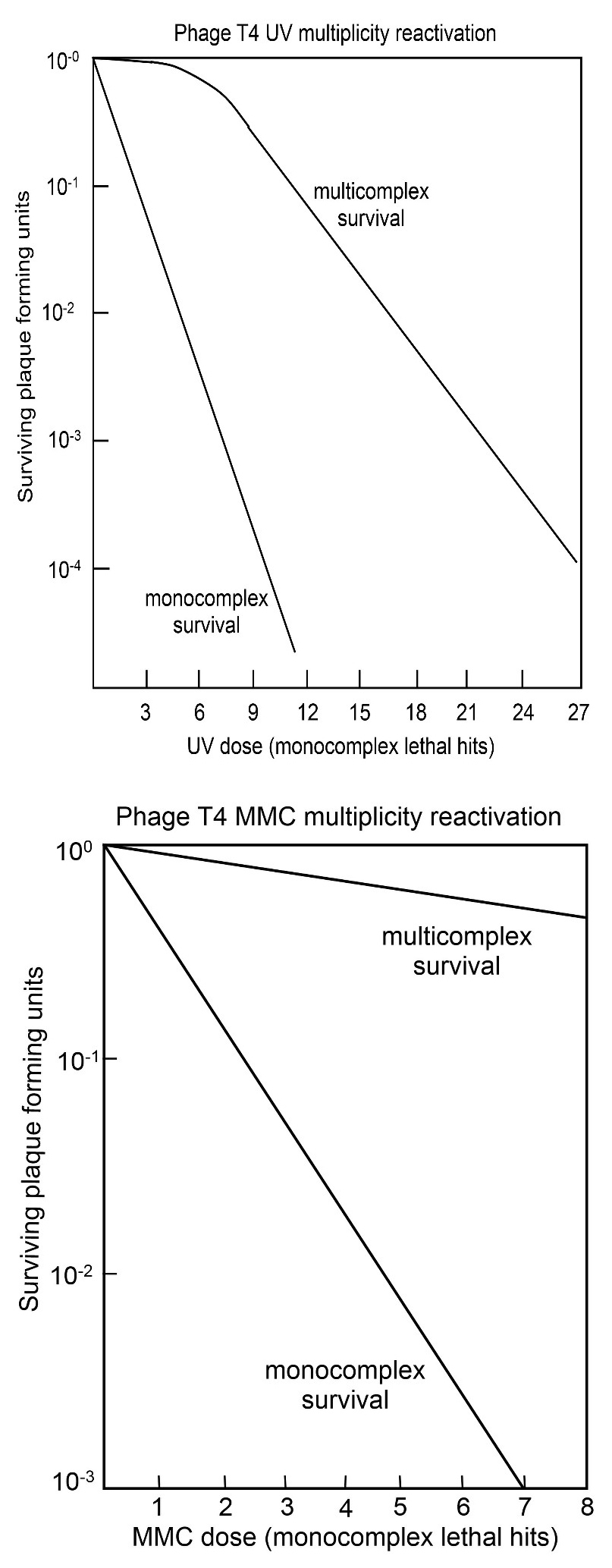
Survival curves for virus T4 with DNA damaged by UV (top) or MMC (bottom) after single virus T4 infecting host cells (monocomplexes) or two or more virus T4 simultaneously infecting host cells (multicomplexes).

Multiplicity reactivation (MR) is the process by which two or more virus genomes, each containing inactivating genome damage, can interact within an infected cell to form a viable virus genome. Salvador Luria, while studying UV irradiated virus T4 in 1946, discovered MR and proposed that the observed reactivation of damaged virus occurs by a recombination mechanism.(see refs.) This preceded the confirmation of DNA as the genetic material in 1952 in related virus T2 by the Hershey–Chase experiment.

As remembered by Luria (1984, pg. 97) the discovery of reactivation of irradiated virus (referred to as "multiplicity reactivation") immediately started a flurry of activity in the study of repair of radiation damage within the early phage group (reviewed by Bernstein in 1981). It turned out later that the repair of damaged virus by mutual help that Luria had discovered was only one special case of DNA repair. Cells of all types, not just, bacteria and their viruses, but all organisms studied, including humans, are now known to have complex biochemical processes for repairing DNA damages (see DNA repair). DNA repair processes are also now recognized as playing critical roles in protecting against aging, cancer, and infertility.

MR is usually represented by "survival curves" where survival of plaque forming ability of multiply infected cells (multicomplexes) is plotted against dose of genome damaging agent. For comparison, the survival of virus plaque forming ability of singly infected cells (monocomplexes) is also plotted against dose of genome damaging agent. The top figure shows the survival curves for virus T4 multicomplexes and monocomplexes with increasing dose of UV light. Since survival is plotted on a log scale it is clear that survival of multicomplexes exceeds that of monocomplexes by very large factors (depending on dose). The UV inactivation curve for multicomplexes has an initial shoulder. Other virus T4 DNA damaging agents with shoulders in their multicomplex survival curves are X-rays and ethyl methane sulfonate (EMS). The presence of a shoulder has been interpreted to mean that two recombinational processes are used. The first one repairs DNA with high efficiency (in the "shoulder"), but is saturated in its ability as damage increases; the second pathway functions at all levels of damage. Surviving T4 virus released from multicomplexes show no increase in mutation, indicating that MR of UV irradiated virus is an accurate process.

The bottom figure shows the survival curves for inactivation of virus T4 by the DNA damaging agent mitomycin C (MMC). In this case the survival curve for multicomplexes has no initial shoulder, suggesting that only the second recombinational repair process described above is active. The efficiency of repair by this process is indicated by the observation that a dose of MMC that allows survival of only 1 in 1,000 monocomplexes allows survival of about 70% of multicomplexes. Similar multicomplex survival curves (without shoulders) were also obtained for the DNA damaging agents P32 decay, psoralen plus near-UV irradiation (PUVA), N-methyl-N'-nitro-N-nitrosoguanidine (MNNG), methyl methane sulfonate (MMS) and nitrous acid.

Several of the genes found to be necessary for MR in virus T4 proved to be orthologs for genes essential for recombination in prokaryotes, eukaryotes and archaea. This includes, for instance, T4 gene uvsX which specifies a protein that has three-dimensional structural homology to RecA from Escherichia coli and the homologous protein RAD51 in eukaryotes and RadA in archaea. It has been suggested that the efficient and accurate recombinational repair of DNA damages during MR may be analogous to the recombinational repair process that occurs during meiosis in eukaryotes.

== History ==
Bacteriophages were first discovered by the English scientist Frederick Twort in 1915 and Félix d'Hérelle in 1917. In the late 1930s, T. L. Rakieten proposed either a mixture of raw sewerage or a lysate from E. coli infected with raw sewerage to the two researchers Milislav Demerec and Ugo Fano. These two researchers isolated T3, T4, T5, and T6 from E.coli. Also, in 1932, the researcher J. Bronfenbrenner had studied and worked on the T2 phage, at which the T2 phage was isolated from the virus. This isolation was made from a fecal material rather than from sewerage. At any rate, Max Delbrück was involved in the discovery of the T even phages. His part was naming the bacteriophages into Type 1(T1), Type 2 (T2), Type 3 (T3), etc.

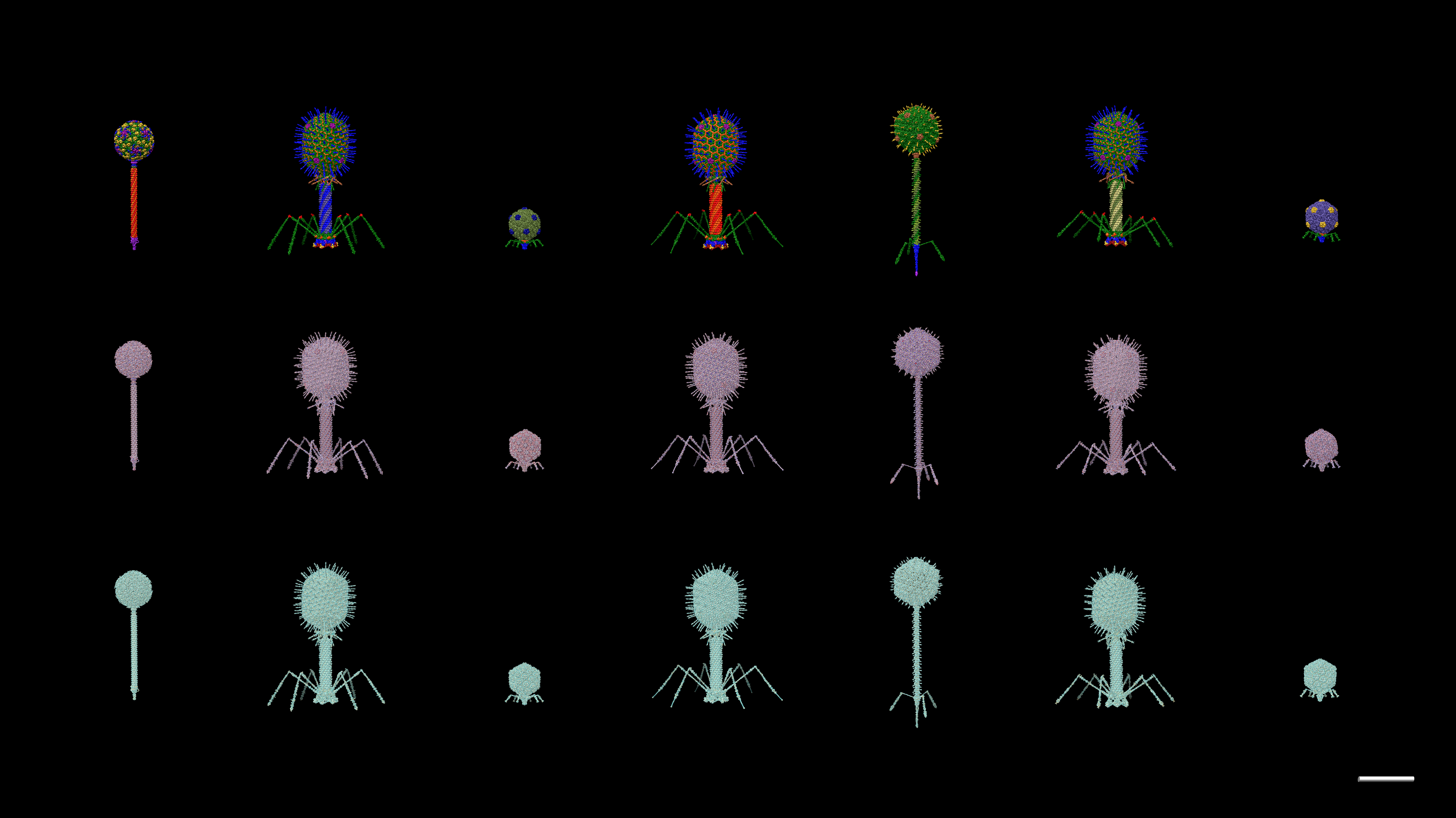
The structure of t bacteriophages at atomic resolution is presented here. From top to bottom: The Chimera software structure is depicted, the Maestro software electrostatics structure is depicted, and the ChimeraX software hydrophilicity structure is depicted in orange-green. bar = 100 nm

The specific time and place of T4 virus isolation remains unclear, though they were likely found in sewage or fecal material. T4 and similar viruses were described in a paper by Thomas F. Anderson, Max Delbrück, and Milislav Demerec in November 1944. In 1943, Salvador Luria and Delbrück showed that bacterial mutations for phage resistance arise in the absence of selection, rather than being a response to selection. The traditional wisdom among bacteriologists prior to 1943 was that bacteria had no chromosomes and no genes. The Luria–Delbrück experiment showed that bacteria, like other established model genetic organisms, have genes, and that these can spontaneously mutate to generate mutants that may then reproduce to form clonal lineages. That year, they also began working with Alfred Hershey, another phage experimenter. (The three would share the 1969 Nobel Prize in Physiology or Medicine, "for work on the replication mechanism and genetics of viruses".)

The phage group was an informal network of biologists centered on Max Delbrück that carried out basic research mainly on bacteriophage T4 and made numerous seminal contributions to microbial genetics and the origins of molecular biology in the mid-20th century. In 1961, Sydney Brenner, an early member of the phage group, collaborated with Francis Crick, Leslie Barnett and Richard Watts-Tobin at the Cavendish Laboratory in Cambridge to perform genetic experiments that demonstrated the basic nature of the genetic code for proteins. These experiments, carried out with mutants of the rIIB gene of phage T4, showed, that for a gene that encodes a protein, three sequential bases of the gene's DNA specify each successive amino acid of the protein. Thus the genetic code is a triplet code, where each triplet (called a codon) specifies a particular amino acid. They also obtained evidence that the codons do not overlap with each other in the DNA sequence encoding a protein, and that such a sequence is read from a fixed starting point.

During 1962–1964 phage T4 researchers provided an opportunity to study the function of virtually all of the genes that are essential for growth of the phage under laboratory conditions. These studies were facilitated by the discovery of two classes of conditional lethal mutants. One class of such mutants is known as amber mutants. Another class of conditional lethal mutants is referred to as temperature-sensitive mutants Studies of these two classes of mutants led to considerable insight into numerous fundamental biologic problems. Thus understanding was gained on the functions and interactions of the proteins employed in the machinery of DNA replication, repair and recombination, and on how viruses are assembled from protein and nucleic acid components (molecular morphogenesis). Furthermore, the role of chain terminating codons was elucidated. One noteworthy study used amber mutants defective in the gene encoding the major head protein of phage T4. This experiment provided strong evidence for the widely held, but prior to 1964 still unproven, "sequence hypothesis" that the amino acid sequence of a protein is specified by the nucleotide sequence of the gene determining the protein. Thus, this study demonstrated the co-linearity of the gene with its encoded protein.

A number of Nobel Prize winners worked with virus T4 or T4-like viruses including Max Delbrück, Salvador Luria, Alfred Hershey, James D. Watson, and Francis Crick. Other important scientists who worked with virus T4 include Michael Rossmann, Seymour Benzer, Bruce Alberts, Gisela Mosig, Richard Lenski, and James Bull.

== See also ==
- T4 rII system
- T2 phage
- T6 phage
- Bacteriophage
- Virology
