= Demjanov rearrangement =

Chemical reaction

The Demjanov rearrangement is the chemical reaction of primary amines with nitrous acid to give rearranged alcohols. It involves substitution by a hydroxyl group with a possible ring expansion. It is named after the Russian chemist Nikolai Jakovlevich Demjanov (Dem'anov, Demianov), who first reported it in 1903.

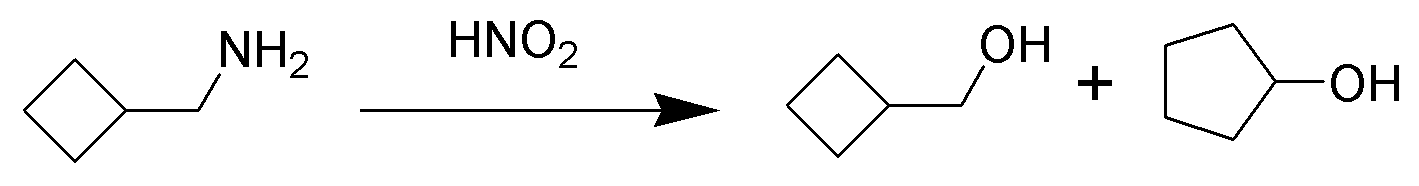

== Reaction mechanism ==
The reaction process begins with diazotization of the amine by nitrous acid. The diazonium group is a good leaving group, forming nitrogen gas when displaced from the organic structure. This displacement can occur via a rearrangement (path A), in which one of the sigma bonds adjacent to the diazo group migrates. This migration results in an expansion of the ring. The resulting carbocation is then attacked by a molecule of water. Alternately, the diazo group can be displaced directly by a molecule of water in an S_{N}2 reaction (path B). Both routes lead to formation of an alcohol.

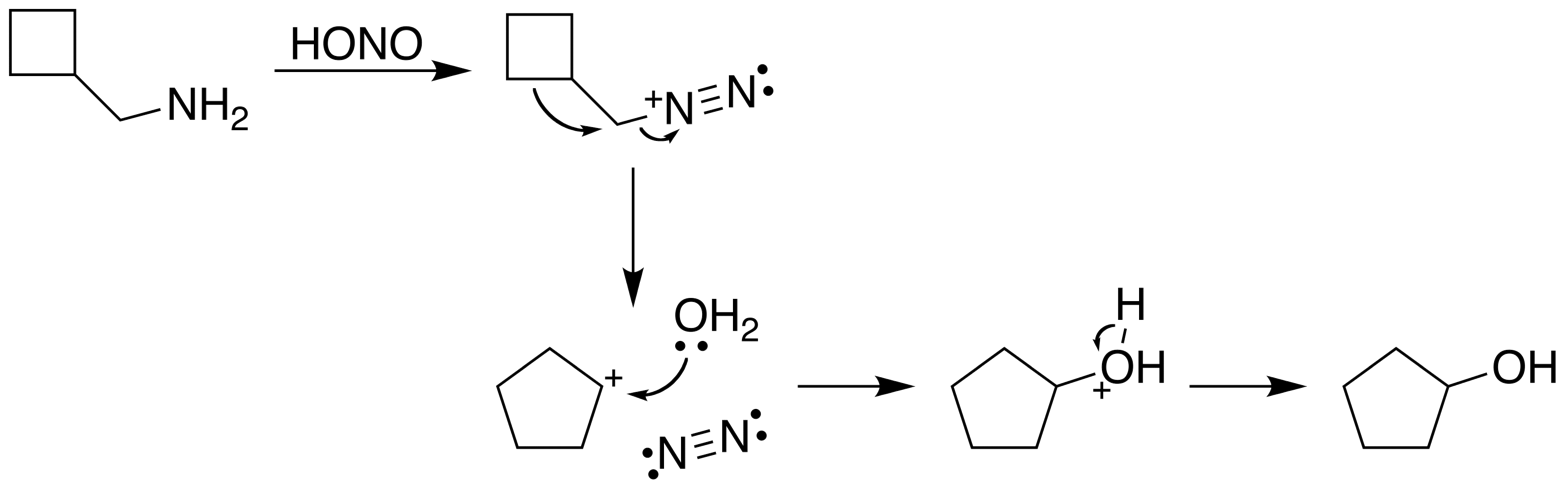
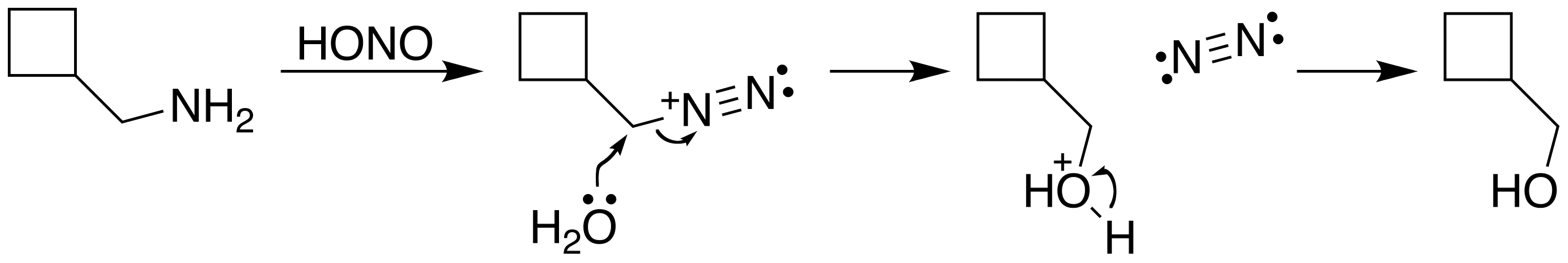
A.
B.

== Uses ==
The Demjanov rearrangement is a method to produce a 1-carbon ring enlargement in four, five or six membered rings. The resulting five, six, and seven-membered rings can then be used in further synthetic reactions.

It has been shown that the Demjanov reaction is susceptible to regioselectivity. One example of this is a study conducted by D. Fattori looking at the regioselectivity of the Demjanov rearrangement in one-carbon enlargements of naked sugars. It showed that when an exo methylamine underwent Demjanov nitrous acid deamination, ring enlargement was not produced.

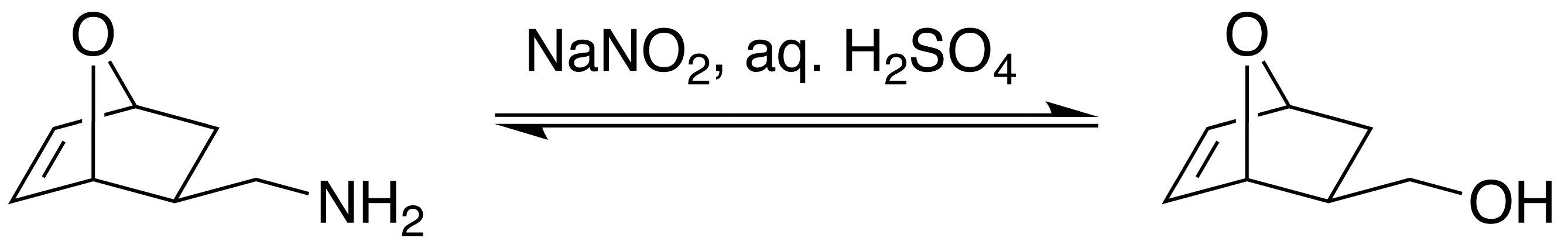

However, when the endo methylamine underwent the same conditions, a mixture of rearranged alcohols were produced.

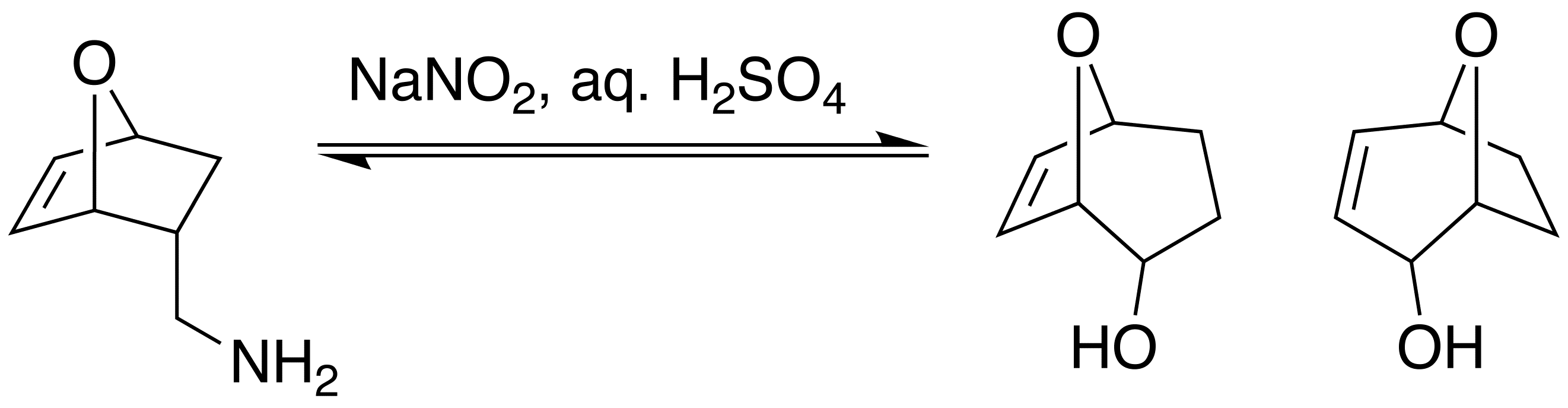

== Problems ==
This rearrangement also leads to a substituted, but not expanded, byproduct. Thus it can be difficult to isolate the two products and acquire the desired yield. Also, stereoisomers are produced depending on the direction of addition of the water molecule and other molecules may be produced depending on rearrangements.

== Variations ==
=== Tiffeneau-Demjanov rearrangement ===
The Tiffeneau-Demjanov rearrangement (after Marc Tiffeneau and Nikolai Demjanov) is a variation of the Demjanov rearrangement, which involves both a ring expansion and the production of a ketone by using sodium nitrite and hydrogen cation. Using the Tiffeneau-Demjanov reaction is often advantageous as, while there are rearrangements possible in the products, the reactant always undergoes ring enlargement. As in the Demjanov rearrangement, products illustrate regioselectivity in the reaction. Migratory aptitudes of functional groups dictate rearrangement products.

=== Use of diazomethane ===
Diazomethane can also perform ring enlargement in the Büchner–Curtius–Schlotterbeck reaction.
