= T6 =

T6 or T-6 may refer to:

== Aircraft ==
- Bikle T-6, a glider
- North American T-6 Texan, a World War II-era single-engine advanced trainer aircraft
- Beechcraft T-6 Texan II, a 2000's era single-engine turboprop trainer aircraft built by the Raytheon Aircraft Company

== Automobiles ==
- Ford Ranger (T6), post-2011 models
- JAC Shuailing T6, a Chinese mid-size pickup truck
- Volvo T6, a 2005 concept car from Volvo
- Volvo T6 engine, a turbocharged gasoline inline six used in the S60, V60, V70, XC70, S80 and XC90
- Volkswagen Transporter (T6), Sixth generation of the Volkswagen Transporter, and the latest iteration released in 2016

== Biology and medicine ==
- Enterobacteria phage T6, a bacteriophage
- T6, an EEG electrode site according to the 10–20 system
- Sixth thoracic vertebra
- Thoracic spinal nerve 6

== Pop culture ==
- Tekken 6, a 2007 fighting game
- Terminator: Dark Fate, the sixth film in the Terminator film franchise

== Rail transport ==
- ALCO T-6, an American diesel switching (shunting) locomotive
- T6, a model of the OS T1000 train of the Oslo Metro
- LSWR T6 class, a British steam locomotive
- T6 Lidcombe & Bankstown Line, a Sydney Trains service, Australia
- T6 Carlingford Line, a former Sydney Trains service, Australia
- Île-de-France tramway Line 6, France
- T6 (Istanbul Tram), a light rail line in Istanbul, Turkey
- Beenleigh line (numbered T6), a Queensland Rail service, Australia
- Ferny Grove line (numbered T6), a Queensland Rail service, Australia

== Roads ==
- T6 road (Tanzania)
- T6 road (Zambia)

== Other uses ==
- Tavrey Airlines, by IATA airline designator
- T6, a size of Torx screwdriver
- T6 space, in topology, a perfectly normal Hausdorff space
- A temper designation for aluminium alloys, indicating 'solution heat treated and artificially aged'
- A tornado intensity rating on the TORRO scale
- A prototype of the U.S. M4 Sherman tank
- A military designation for Östgöta Logistic Corps

== See also ==
- 6T (disambiguation)
- ʨ, a similar-looking symbol used in the IPA alphabet
