= Ackermannviridae =

Virus classification
- (unranked): Virus
- Realm: Duplodnaviria
- Kingdom: Heunggongvirae
- Phylum: Uroviricota
- Class: Caudoviricetes
- Order: Pantevenvirales
- Family: Ackermannviridae

Family of viruses

Ackermannviridae is a family of viruses in the order Pantevenvirales, class Caudoviricetes. Gammaproteobacteria in the phylum Pseudomonadota serve as natural hosts. The family has two subfamilies and ten genera.

== Etymology ==
The family's name, Ackermann is in honor of Hans-Wolfgang Ackermann (1936–2017), a German microbiologist, the suffix -viridae is the standard suffix for virus families.

== Taxonomy ==
The following taxa are recognized (-virinae denotes subfamily and -virus denotes genus):

- Aglimvirinae
  - Agtrevirus
  - Limestonevirus
- Cvivirinae
  - Kuttervirus

incertae sedis genera (not assigned to a subfamily):

- Campanilevirus
- Kujavirus
- Miltonvirus
- Nezavisimistyvirus
- Taipeivirus
- Tedavirus
- Vapseptimavirus
