= Nitrosyl-O-hydroxide =

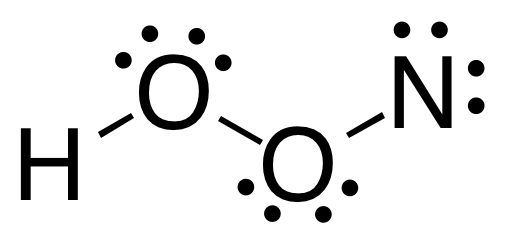

Names
- IUPAC name Nitrosyl-O-hydroxide
- Other names Hydroperoxynitrene; Isonitrosyl hydroxide

Identifiers
CAS Number	877456-58-1
3D model (JSmol)	Interactive image
PubChem CID	57470747
- InChI: InChI=1S/HNO2/c1-3-2/h2H Key: YSVOEFLTELYJNZ-UHFFFAOYSA-N
- SMILES: [N-]=[O+]O

Properties
Chemical formula	HNO_{2}
Molar mass	47.013 g/mol
- Except where otherwise noted, data are given for materials in their standard state (at 25 °C [77 °F], 100 kPa). Infobox references

Nitrosyl-O-hydroxide (molecular formula HOON) is an isomer of nitrous acid, which has been experimentally observed in the gas phase. HOON contains the longest oxygen-oxygen bond thus far observed in any known molecule, measured to be 1.9149 angstroms. There had been speculation about the existence of this molecule, and ab initio calculations have suggested that it might have a stable chemically bonded structure.

== Structure ==
The HOON structure was generated by the McCarthy group in a pulsed supersonic expansion of a gaseous mixture of nitric oxide and water vapor diluted with neon. The molecule was detected using Fourier transform microwave spectroscopy. The equilibrium structure of nitrosyl-O-hydroxide in the gas-phase was determined to be a planar structure, adopting a trans conformation. The structure shown below is a semi-empirical structure derived from a combination of experimental data and theoretically derived vibration-rotation constants.

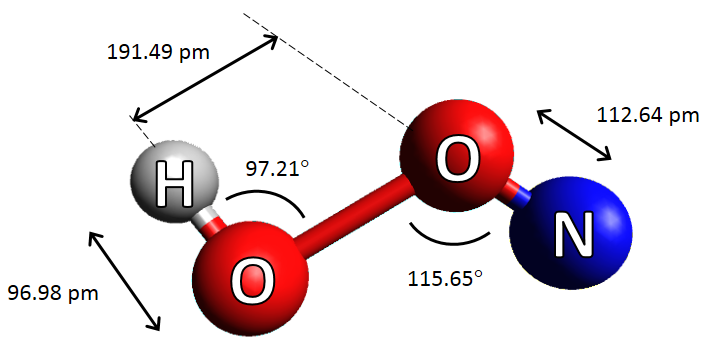
dimensions of the trans form
(from the microwave spectrum)

Early theoretical work had suggested the HOON structure should be extremely unstable, decomposing with no significant activation barrier into hydroxyl radical and nitric oxide:

HOON → OH + NO
