= 6T =

6T or 6-T may references to:

- 6T, IATA code for Air Mandalay
- 6T Thunderbird; see Triumph Thunderbird
- 6T SRAM (for 6 transistors); see 1T-SRAM
- RDS-6t Truba warhead; see Joe 4
- Ye-6T, one of the 1958 Mikoyan-Gurevich MiG-21 variants
- 2-8-6T locomotive; see 2-8-6
- PRC-6T walkie-talkie; see AN/PRC-6
- 6T, the production code for the 1985 Doctor Who serial Attack of the Cybermen
- OnePlus 6T, an Android-based smartphone manufactured by OnePlus

== See also ==
- T6 (disambiguation)
