= Lycée Lamartine =

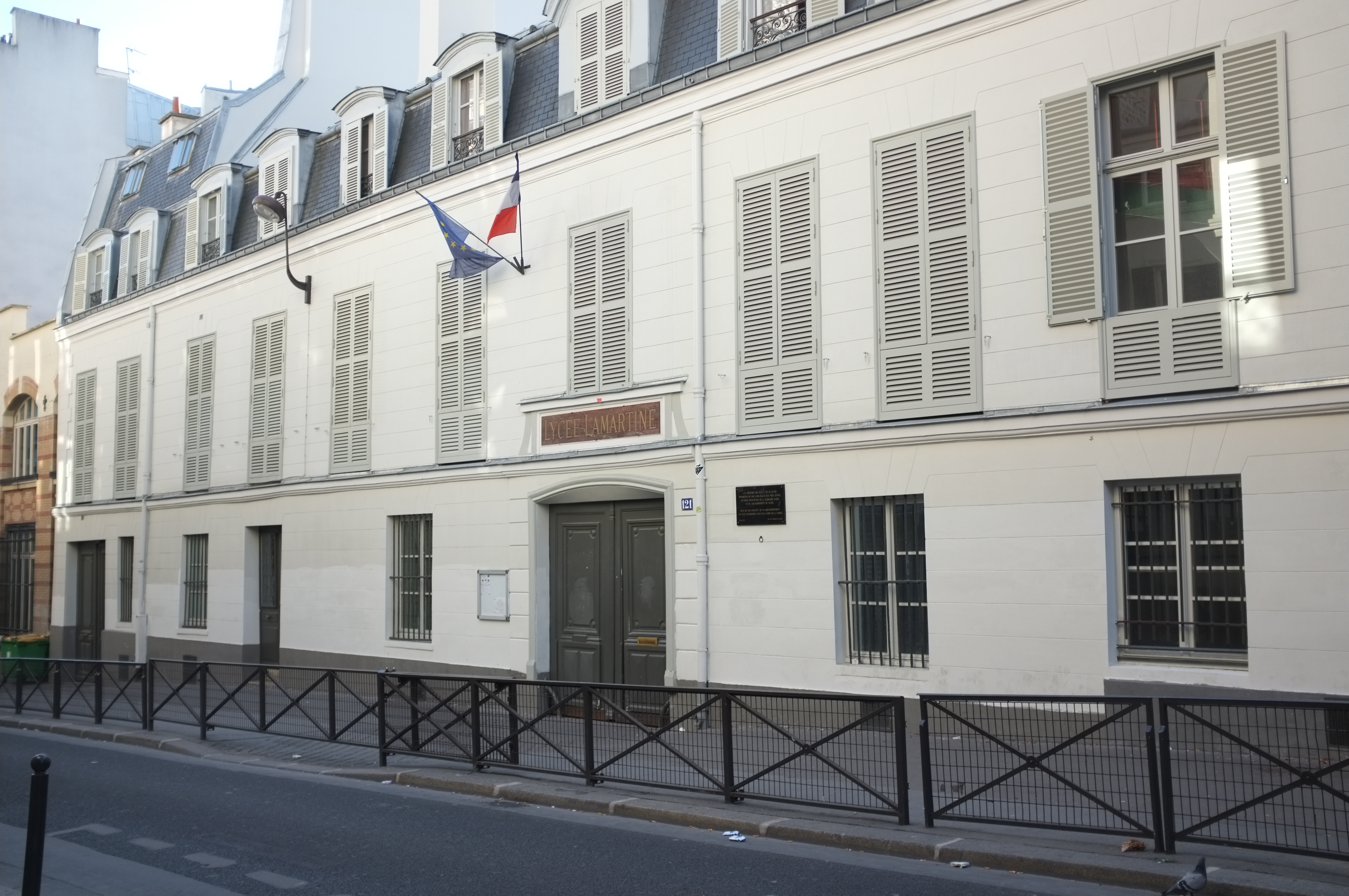

Location
- 121 rue du Faubourg-Poissonnière; 9th arrondissement of Paris; Paris, 75009; France
- Coordinates: 48.87847°N 2.34902°E

Information
- Founded: 1893

The Lycée Lamartine is a French institute of secondary education in the 9th arrondissement of Paris. It combines a collège, a lycée, and a Classe préparatoire aux grandes écoles (prep school for the Grandes écoles). The school is named for the 19th-century writer Alphonse de Lamartine.

== History ==
The lycée was founded in 1893 in a former folly owned by Pierre Beauchamps. Some parts of the current building date from a renovation done in 1740 by Jacques Hardouin-Mansart de Sagonne; the panelling in one of the ancient rooms is designated a National Heritage. The national department of education acquired the building in 1891 and turned it into a lycée for girls. In 1914, a baccalauréat in science was first awarded; one of the students receiving it, Jeanne Lévy, became the first woman professor at the medical school of the University of Paris, in 1934. The directrice from 1917 to 1919 was Marguerite Canon, an educator who also directed two other Parisian schools, the Lycée Jules-Ferry (1919-1922) and the Lycée Fénelon (1922-1930).

From June to August 1940 the school provided for the many refugees fleeing the German advance. During the war, dozens of the school's Jewish students were deported.

In the 1960s the entrance exam was dropped and combined with the population increase resulting from the baby boom the number of students at the school increased greatly. An adjoining building was annexed. During the unrest of the May 1968 events in France, the students managed to rewrite the old student regulations, which were deemed too strict.

== Notable students ==
- Stéphane Audran
- Jeanne Galzy, whose novel Burnt Offering contains a school based on the Lycée
- Christiane Klapisch-Zuber, historian, anthropologist and academic.
- Marie Laurencin
- Dina Lévi-Strauss
- Jeanne Lévy

== In fiction ==
- Barbara Corrado Pope's The Missing Italian Girl (2013) is set at the Lycée.
