= Jeanne Lévy =

French pharmacologist and communist (1895–1993)

- Born: 5 November 1895; Algiers, Algeria
- Died: 1 July 1993 (aged 97); 14th arrondissement of Paris, France
- Occupations: Pharmacologist; communist activist

Academic background
- Education: University of Paris

Jeanne Louise Lévy (5 November 1895 – 1 July 1993) was a French pharmacologist and communist. Originally studying chemistry, she published a monograph on bioassays, Essais et dosages biologiques des substances médicamenteuses, in 1930. After World War II, she joined the French Communist Party, ran twice for the National Assembly, and supported Lysenkoism.

== Biography ==
=== Early life, early career, and wartime ===
Jeanne Louise Lévy was born on 5 November 1895 in Algiers, located in the then-French colony of Algeria; she was the daughter of Émile Lévy. Raised in the Catholic faith, she attended the Lycée Lamartine and obtained a baccalauréat scientifique in 1914, one of the first girls in France to do so. She studied at the University of Paris Faculty of Sciences under chemist Marc Tiffeneau; there, she obtained certificates in general chemistry (1915), general mathematics (1916), and general physics (1917).

During World War I, she worked for the war chemistry laboratory from 1916 to 1918. After the war ended, she worked in the Association philotechnique as an organic chemistry teacher from 1921 to 1923. She obtained her doctorate degree in physical sciences in 1921, and she later started working with biochemist Ernest Kahane. In 1930, she published a monograph on bioassays, titled Essais et dosages biologiques des substances médicamenteuses. In 1931, she obtained a second doctorate, in medicine.

In 1934, she became the first woman professor to work at the University of Paris Faculty of Medicine, where she initially taught pharmacology, as well as the first woman to obtain an agrégation de médecine in biochemistry, in organic chemistry, and in pharmacology.

Lévy, who was of Jewish descent, went into hiding due to World War II, and she joined the French Resistance. After proving that she was not legally a Jew, she began teaching at the University of Toulouse Faculty of Medicine in June 1943.

=== Communist activism, later life, and death ===
Lévy joined the French Communist Party after World War II. She benefited from her association with the then-Communist-run Ministry of Health, who hired her as manager of an Institut Alfred-Fournier laboratory for drugs against venereal diseases, as well as an advisor to the minister. She was vice-president of Le Renouveau, an organization focused on helping children affected by Nazi Germany and its Vichy France puppet regime. She ran as an unsuccessful Communist party-list candidate in the 1951 and 1956 French legislative election, and in 1953 she joined other communist doctors in a declaration published in L'Humanité to protest against several doctors who were briefly arrested in the Soviet doctors' plot before being released after the death of Joseph Stalin.

In 1948, she published an article supporting Lysenkoism, which she continued to do so by 1953. Yves Vargas said that "she avoids opposing "Soviet science" to "classical science" and shows the possible bridges" between them and "ultimately does not engage as a scientist, but as a Marxist". She was among several academics Denis Buican denounced in 1987 for "praising [this] false science".

She returned to the Paris Faculty of Medicine, where she became a lecturer in January 1949, and in 1959, their first chair professor and their first woman pharmacology professor. She became their co-chair of pharmacology in 1964, and she retired two years later. In 1987, she worked as the director of the Laboratoire national du contrôle du médicament de la Santé publique. She died on 1 July 1993 in the 14th arrondissement of Paris.

== Publications ==
- Essais et dosages biologiques des substances médicamenteuses (1930)
