= Kyanoviridae =

Virus classification
- (unranked): Virus
- Realm: Duplodnaviria
- Kingdom: Heunggongvirae
- Phylum: Uroviricota
- Class: Caudoviricetes
- Order: Pantevenvirales
- Family: Kyanoviridae

Genera
- see text

Family of viruses

Kyanoviridae is a family of bacteriophages in the order Pantevenvirales, class Caudoviricetes. The viruses in this family were formerly place in the morphology-based family Myoviridae, which was found to be paraphyletic in genome studies and abolished in the 2021 International Committee on Taxonomy of Viruses (ICTV) classification, although the term myovirus is still used to refer to the morphology of viruses in this new family. Bacteria and archaea serve as natural hosts. There are currently 66 species in this family, assigned to 54 genera.

== Taxonomy ==
The family was erected to contain 26 genera that were previously placed in the morphology-based family Myoviridae, which was found to be paraphyletic in genomic studies and abolished in the 2021 ICTV classification. The original circumscription also contained 20 new genera. In the 2025 ICTV classification, the family contains 66 species in 54 genera. The family's genera are listed hereafter.

- Acionnavirus
- Ahtivirus
- Alisovirus
- Anaposvirus
- Atlauavirus
- Bellamyvirus
- Bristolvirus
- Brizovirus
- Chalconvirus
- Charybdisvirus
- Cymopoleiavirus
- Emcearvirus
- Galenevirus
- Gibbetvirus
- Glaucusvirus
- Greenvirus
- Haifavirus
- Huanghaivirus
- Kanaloavirus
- Leucotheavirus
- Libanvirus
- Lipsvirus
- Lowelvirus
- Macariavirus
- Makaravirus
- Makelovirus
- Mazuvirus
- Namakavirus
- Neptunevirus
- Nereusvirus
- Neritesvirus
- Nerrivikvirus
- Nilusvirus
- Nodensvirus
- Ormenosvirus
- Palaemonvirus
- Pontusvirus
- Potamoivirus
- Ronodorvirus
- Salacisavirus
- Scyllavirus
- Sedonavirus
- Serangoonvirus
- Shandvirus
- Shenzhenivirus
- Sokavirus
- Tamkungvirus
- Tefnutvirus
- Thaumasvirus
- Thetisvirus
- Vellamovirus
- Yellowseavirus
- Yushanluvirus
- Zhoulongquanvirus
