= Nitrous acid =

- Nitrous acid

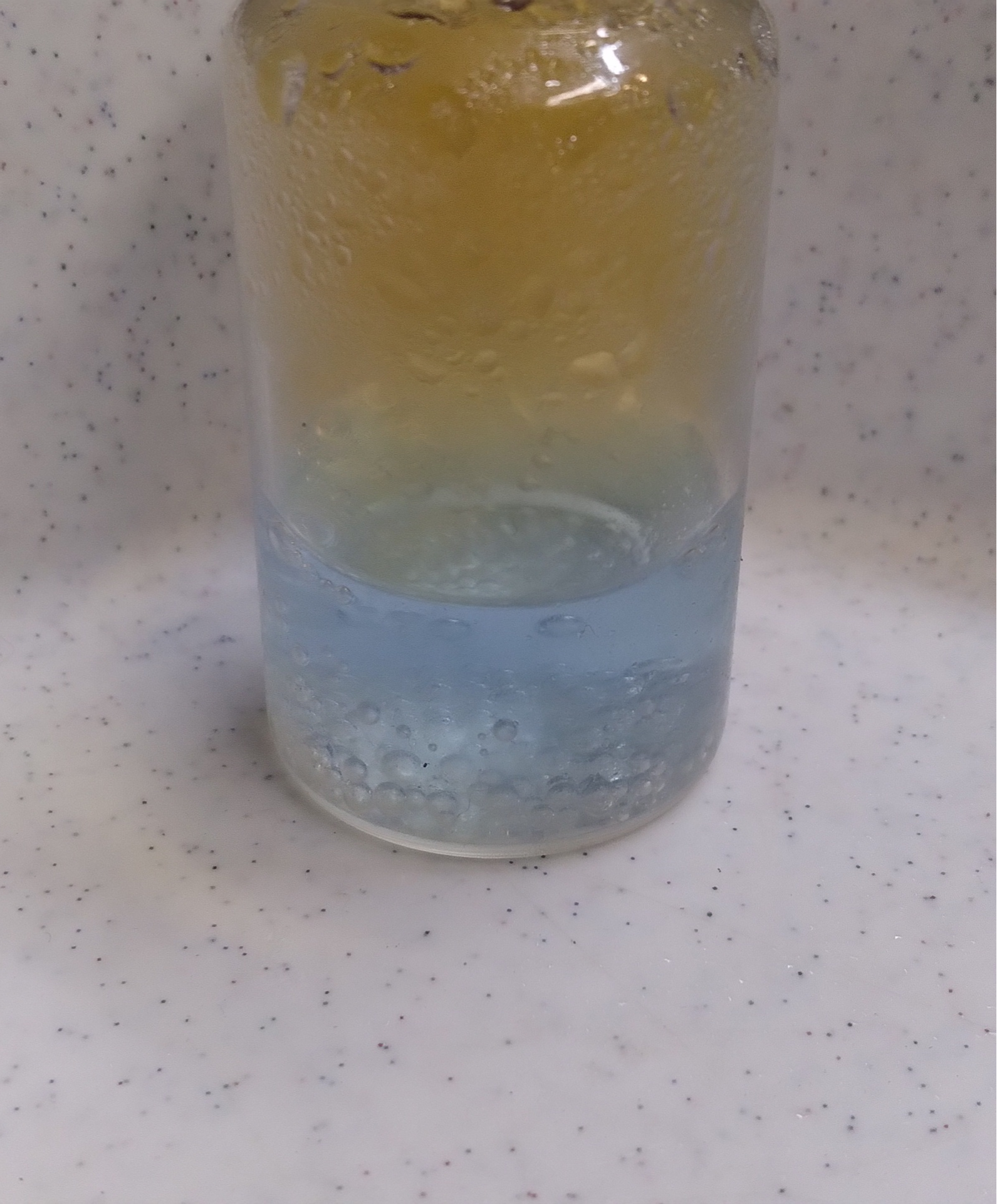

Names
- IUPAC name Nitrous acid

Identifiers
CAS Number	7782-77-6
3D model (JSmol)	Interactive image
ChEBI	CHEBI:25567
ChEMBL	ChEMBL1161681
ChemSpider	22936
ECHA InfoCard	100.029.057
EC Number	231-963-7
Gmelin Reference	983
KEGG	C00088
MeSH	Nitrous+acid
PubChem CID	24529
UNII	T2I5UM75DN
CompTox Dashboard (EPA)	DTXSID7064813
- InChI: InChI=1S/HNO2/c2-1-3/h(H,2,3) Key: IOVCWXUNBOPUCH-UHFFFAOYSA-N
- SMILES: O=NO

Properties
Chemical formula	HNO_{2}
Molar mass	47.013 g·mol^{−1}
Appearance	Pale blue solution
Density	Approx. 1 g/ml
Melting point	Only known in solution or as gas
Acidity (pK_{a})	3.15
Conjugate base	Nitrite

Hazards
- GHS labelling
Pictograms	(GHS05: Corrosive) (GHS06: Toxic) (GHS09: Environmental hazard)
Signal word	Danger
Hazard statements	H300, H314, H400
Precautionary statements	P260, P264, P264+P265, P270, P273, P280, P301+P316, P301+P330+P331, P302+P361+P354, P304+P340, P305+P354+P338, P316, P317, P321, P330, P363, P391, P405, P501
NFPA 704 (fire diamond)	4 0 2 OX
Flash point	Non-flammable

Related compounds
Other anions	Nitric acid
Other cations	Sodium nitrite Potassium nitrite Ammonium nitrite
Related compounds	Dinitrogen trioxide
- Except where otherwise noted, data are given for materials in their standard state (at 25 °C [77 °F], 100 kPa). verify (what is ?) Infobox references

Nitrous acid (molecular formula HNO_{2}) is a weak and monoprotic acid known only in solution, in the gas phase, and in the form of nitrite (NO_{2}^{−}) salts. It was discovered by Carl Wilhelm Scheele, who called it "phlogisticated acid of niter". Nitrous acid is used to make diazonium salts from amines. The resulting diazonium salts are reagents in azo coupling reactions to give azo dyes.

== Structure ==
In the gas phase, the planar nitrous acid molecule can adopt both a syn and an anti form. The anti form predominates at room temperature, and IR measurements indicate it is more stable by around 2.3 kJ/mol.

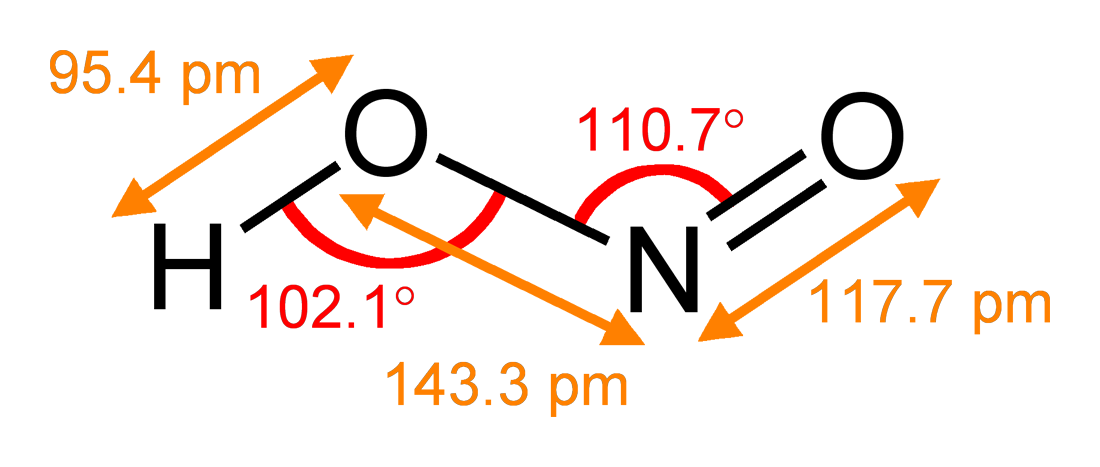
Dimensions of the anti form
(from the microwave spectrum)

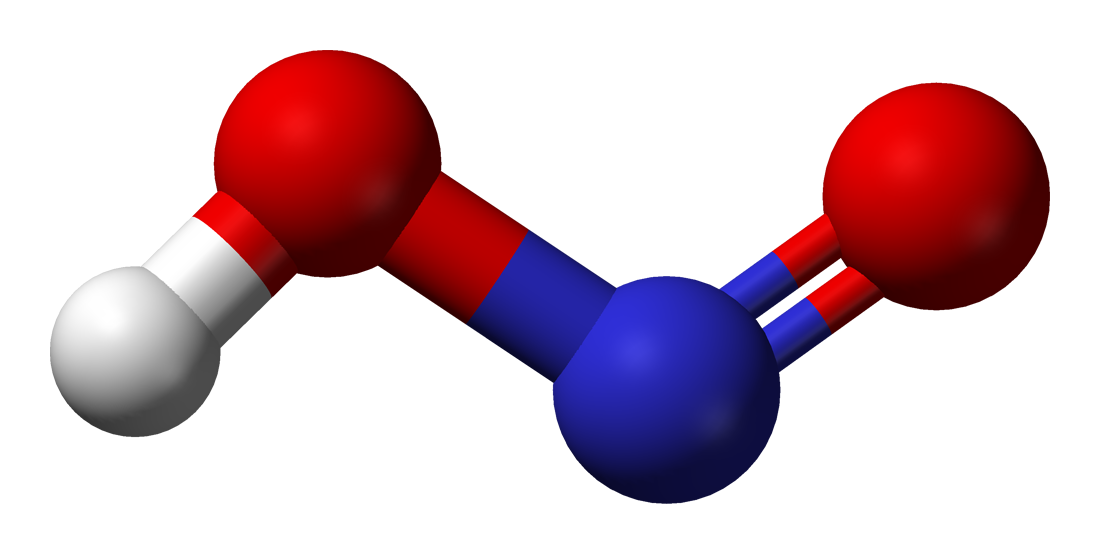
Model of the anti form

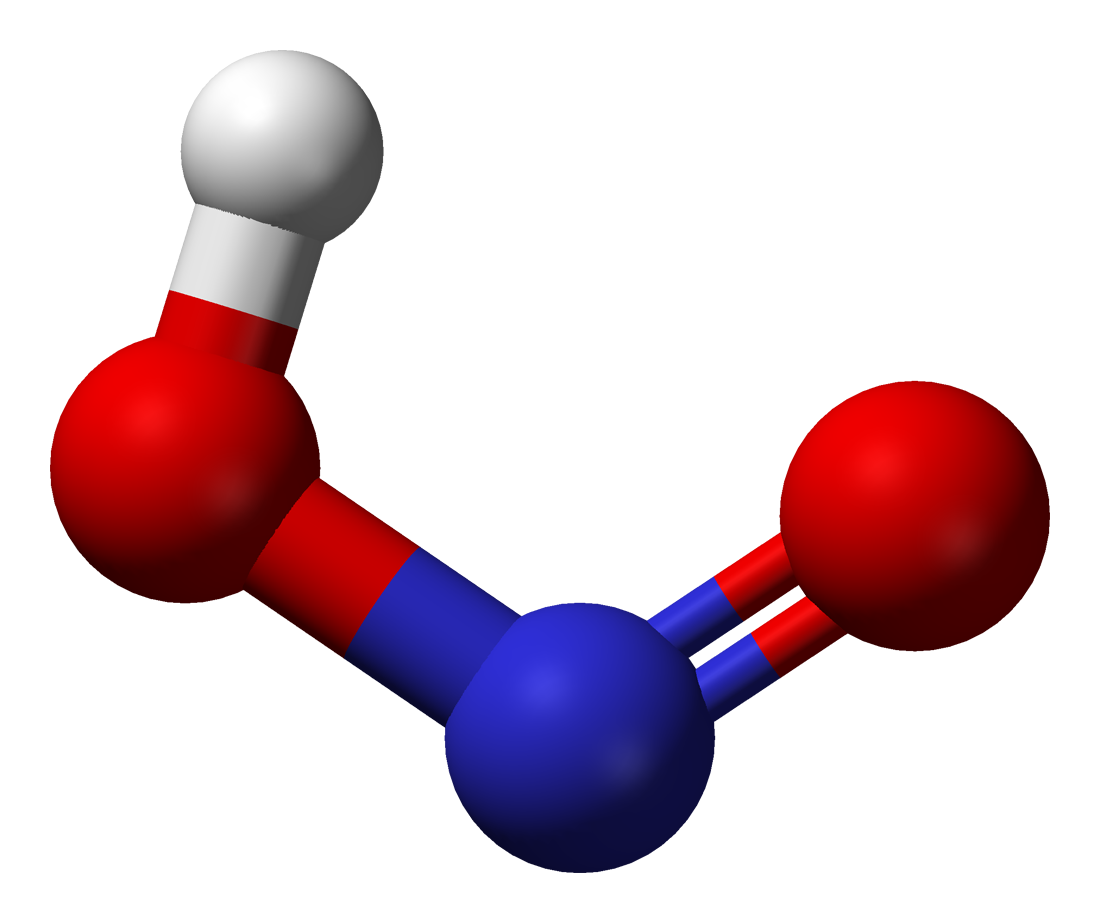
syn form

== Decomposition and preparation ==
Free, gaseous nitrous acid is unstable, rapidly disproportionating to nitric oxides:

2 HNO_{2} → NO_{2} + NO + H_{2}O

In aqueous solution, the nitrous acid also disproportionates, for a net reaction producing nitric oxide and nitric acid:

3 HNO_{2} → 2 NO + HNO_{3} + H_{2}O

Consequently applications of nitrous acid usually begin with mineral acid acidification of sodium nitrite. The acidification is usually conducted at ice temperatures, and the HNO_{2} consumed in situ.

Nitrous acid equilibrates with dinitrogen trioxide in water, so that concentrated solutions are visibly blue:

N_{2}O_{3} + H_{2}O ⇌ 2 HNO_{2}

Addition of dinitrogen trioxide to water is thus another preparatory technique.

== Chemical applications ==
Nitrous acid is the main chemophore in the Liebermann reagent, used to spot-test for alkaloids.

At high acidities (pH ≪ 2), nitrous acid is protonated to give water and nitrosonium cations.

=== Reduction ===
With I^{−} and Fe^{2+} ions, NO is formed:

2 HNO_{2} + 2 KI + 2 H_{2}SO_{4} → I_{2} + 2 NO + 2 H_{2}O + 2 K_{2}SO_{4}
2 HNO_{2} + 2 FeSO_{4} + 2 H_{2}SO_{4} → Fe_{2}(SO_{4})_{3} + 2 NO + 2 H_{2}O + K_{2}SO_{4}

With Sn^{2+} ions, N_{2}O is formed:

2 HNO_{2} + 4 HCl + 2 SnCl_{2} → 2 SnCl_{4} + N_{2}O + 3 H_{2}O

With SO_{2} gas, NH_{2}OH is formed:

2 KNO_{2} + 6 H_{2}O + 4 SO_{2} → 3 H_{2}SO_{4} + K_{2}SO_{4} + 2 NH_{2}OH

With Zn in alkali solution, NH_{3} is formed:

5 H_{2}O + KNO_{2} + 3 Zn → NH_{3} + KOH + 3 Zn(OH)_{2}

With N_{2}H_{5}^{+}, both HN_{3} and (subsequently) N_{2} gas are formed:

HNO_{2} + [N_{2}H_{5}]^{+} → HN_{3} + H_{2}O + H_{3}O^{+}

HNO_{2} + HN_{3} → N_{2}O + N_{2} + H_{2}O

Oxidation by nitrous acid has a kinetic control over thermodynamic control, this is best illustrated that dilute nitrous acid is able to oxidize I^{−} to I_{2}, but dilute nitric acid cannot.

I_{2} + 2 e^{−} ⇌ 2 I^{−} E^{~~o~~} = +0.54 V

NO_{3}^{−} + 3 H^{+} + 2 e^{−} ⇌ HNO_{2} + H_{2}O E^{~~o~~} = +0.93 V

HNO_{2} + H^{+} + e^{−} ⇌ NO + H_{2}O E^{~~o~~} = +0.98 V

It can be seen that the values of E^{o}_{cell} for these reactions are similar, but nitric acid is a more powerful oxidizing agent. Based on the fact that dilute nitrous acid can oxidize iodide into iodine, it can be deduced that nitrous is a faster, rather than a more powerful, oxidizing agent than dilute nitric acid.

=== Organic chemistry ===
Nitrous acid is used to prepare diazonium salts:

HNO_{2} + ArNH_{2} + H^{+} → ArN_{2}^{+} + 2 H_{2}O

where Ar is an aryl group.

Such salts are widely used in organic synthesis, e.g., for the Sandmeyer reaction and in the preparation azo dyes, brightly colored compounds that are the basis of a qualitative test for anilines. Nitrous acid is used to destroy toxic and potentially explosive sodium azide. For most purposes, nitrous acid is usually formed in situ by the action of mineral acid on sodium nitrite: It is mainly blue in colour

NaNO_{2} + HCl → HNO_{2} + NaCl
2 NaN_{3} + 2 HNO_{2} → 3 N_{2} + 2 NO + 2 NaOH

Reaction with two α-hydrogen atoms in ketones creates oximes, which may be further oxidized to a carboxylic acid, or reduced to form amines. This process is used in the commercial production of adipic acid.

Nitrous acid reacts rapidly with aliphatic alcohols to produce alkyl nitrites, which are potent vasodilators:

(CH_{3})_{2}CHCH_{2}CH_{2}OH + HNO_{2} → (CH_{3})_{2}CHCH_{2}CH_{2}ONO + H_{2}O

The carcinogens called nitrosamines are produced, usually not intentionally, by the reaction of nitrous acid with secondary amines:

HNO_{2} + R_{2}NH → R_{2}N-NO + H_{2}O

In the Abidi alkyne synthesis, a trisubstituted isopropylidene olefin reacts with NaNO_{2}/HOAc-H_{2}O with overall loss of the elements of methane to give a methyl substituted alkyne. The reaction mechanism of this highly unusual process is complex and uncertain, with proposals advanced by Corey and then Zard.

== Atmosphere of the Earth ==
Nitrous acid is involved in the ozone budget of the lower atmosphere, the troposphere. The heterogeneous reaction of nitric oxide (NO) and water produces nitrous acid. When this reaction takes place on the surface of atmospheric aerosols, the product readily photolyses to hydroxyl radicals.

== DNA damage and mutation ==
Treatment of Escherichia coli cells with nitrous acid causes damage to the cell's DNA including deamination of cytosine to uracil, and these damages are subject to repair by specific enzymes. Also, nitrous acid causes base substitution mutations in organisms with double-stranded DNA.

== See also ==
- Demjanov rearrangement
- Nitric acid (HNO_{3})
- Nitrosyl-O-hydroxide
- Tiffeneau-Demjanov rearrangement
