= Nikolay Demyanov =

Russian chemist

Nikolay Yakovlevich Demyanov
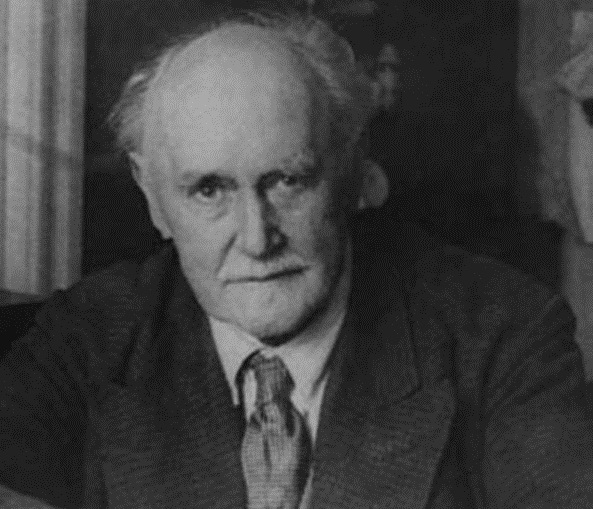
- Born: 27 March [O.S. 15 March] 1861; Tver
- Died: March 19, 1938 (aged 77); Moscow
- Education: Imperial Moscow University; Academician of the Russian Academy of Sciences
- Known for: Demjanov rearrangement
- Awards: Lenin Prize (1930)
- Scientific career
- Fields: Organic chemistry
- Thesis: On the action of nitric anhydride and nitrogenous oxide on hydrocarbons of the ethylene series
- Doctoral advisor: Vladimir Markovnikov

Nikolay Yakovlevich Demyanov (Russian: Никола́й Я́ковлевич Демья́нов; 27 March [O.S. 15 March] 1861, Tver – March 19, 1938, Moscow), also known as Demjanov and Demjanow, was a Russian organic chemist and a member of the USSR Academy of Sciences (1929). He is internationally known for the Demjanov rearrangement organic reaction and other discoveries.

He was a recipient of the Lenin Prize in 1930.

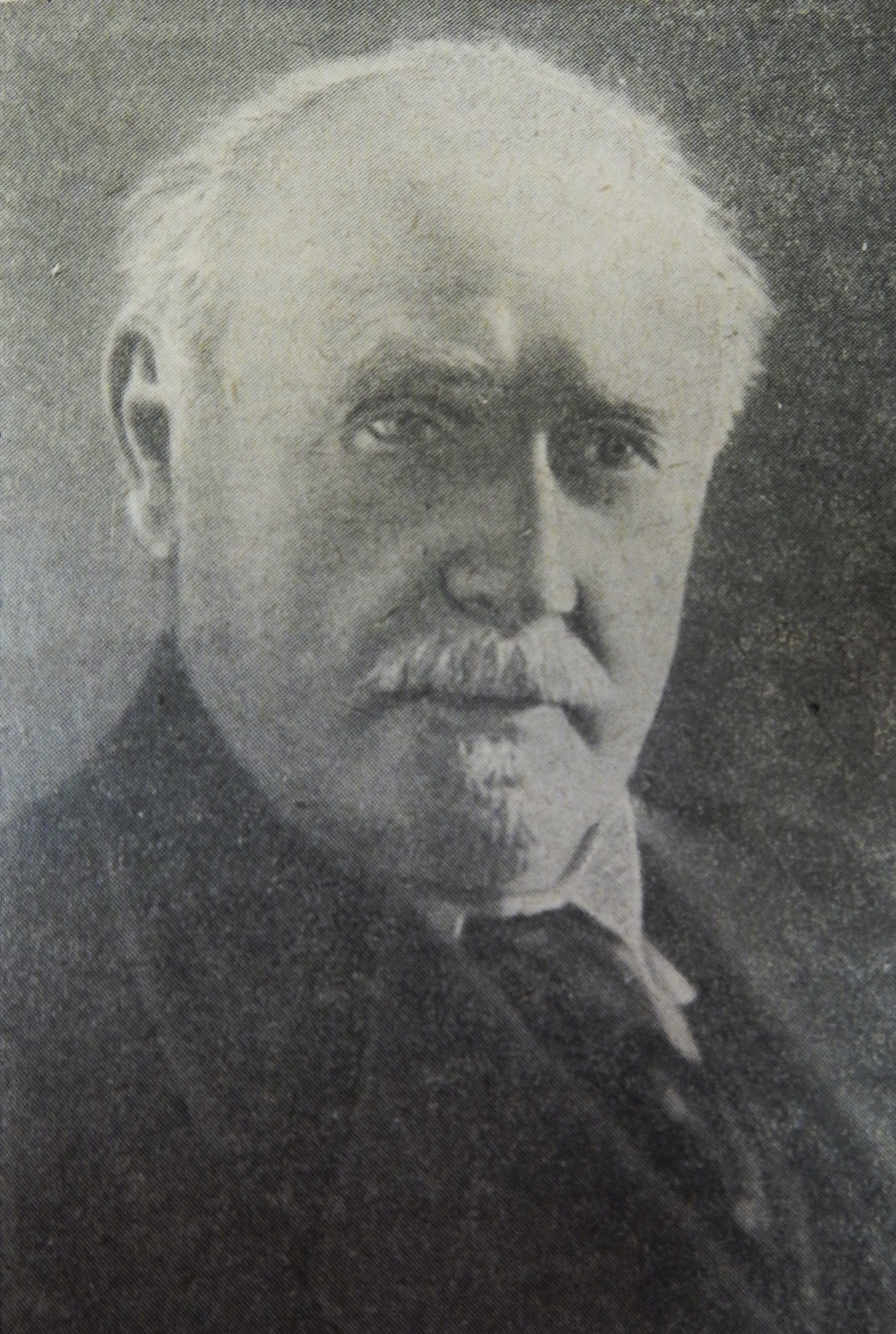

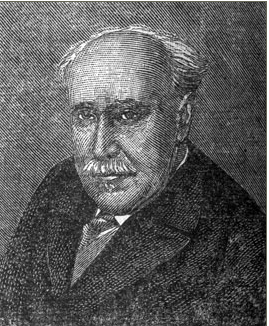

== Bibliography ==
- Imperial Moscow University: 1755-1917: encyclopedic dictionary. Moscow: Russian political encyclopedia (ROSSPEN). 2010. pp. 212–213. ISBN 978-5-8243-1429-8 – via A. Andreev, D. Tsygankov.
