= Gisela Mosig =

German biologist

- Born: November 29, 1930; Saxony, Schmorkau/Oschatz, Germany
- Died: January 12, 2003 (aged 72); Nashville, Tennessee, U.S.
- Known for: Molecular biology of enterobacteria phage T4
- Scientific career
- Fields: Molecular genetics

Gisela Mosig (November 29, 1930 – January 12, 2003) was a German-American molecular biologist best known for her work with enterobacteria phage T4. She was among the first investigators to recognize the importance of recombination intermediates in establishing new DNA replication forks, a fundamental process in DNA replication.

== Early years ==
While growing up on a farm in Saxony, Mosig became interested in biology and physics. After World War II, the region where she lived became part of East Germany and evolutionary teaching in her high school skewed toward Lysenkoism. Finding the intellectual atmosphere intolerable, she fled to the west on her bicycle with only the belongings she could carry. After undergraduate studies at the University of Bonn, she earned her doctoral degree in plant genetics at the University of Cologne in 1959.

From there, she was recruited to Vanderbilt University to study bacteriophage T4, a topic for which she became a leading investigator. After postdoctoral research at Vanderbilt and then the Carnegie Institute of Washington at Cold Spring Harbor (with Nobel laureate A. D. Hershey), she returned to Vanderbilt as a faculty member in 1965, and became a citizen of the United States of America in 1968. Mosig served on the Vanderbilt faculty until her death in 2003.

== Recognition ==
- Outstanding Graduate Teaching Award (Vanderbilt, 1989)
- Elected Fellow of the American Academy of Microbiology (1994)
- Earl Sutherland Prize for Achievement in Research (Vanderbilt, 1995)

== Death ==
Mosig died at Alive Hospice in Nashville a few years after being diagnosed with metastatic ovarian cancer. She was 72 years old. In her will she endowed a fund to support scholarly travel for Vanderbilt graduate students in the biological sciences.

== Key publications ==
- Mosig, G (June 1968). "A map of distances along the DNA molecule of phage T4". Genetics. 59 (2): 137–51. doi:10.1093/genetics/59.2.137. PMC 1211937. PMID 5702346.
- Luder, A; Mosig, G (February 1982). "Two alternative mechanisms for initiation of DNA replication forks in bacteriophage T4: priming by RNA polymerase and by recombination". Proceedings of the National Academy of Sciences of the United States of America. 79 (4): 1101–5. Bibcode:1982PNAS...79.1101L. doi:10.1073/pnas.79.4.1101. PMC 345908. PMID 7041114.
- Mathews, Christoper K.; Kutter, Elizabeth M.; Mosig, Gisela; Berget, Peter B. (1983). Bacteriophage T4. Washington, D.C.: American Soc. for Microbiology. ISBN 0914826565.
- Mosig, G (1987). "The essential role of recombination in phage T4 growth". Annual Review of Genetics. 21: 347–71. doi:10.1146/annurev.ge.21.120187.002023. PMID 3327469.
- Mosig, G (1998). "Recombination and recombination-dependent DNA replication in bacteriophage T4". Annual Review of Genetics. 32: 379–413. doi:10.1146/annurev.genet.32.1.379. PMID 9928485.
- Miller, ES; Kutter, E; Mosig, G; Arisaka, F; Kunisawa, T; Rüger, W (March 2003). "Bacteriophage T4 genome". Microbiology and Molecular Biology Reviews. 67 (1): 86–156. doi:10.1128/mmbr.67.1.86-156.2003. PMC 150520. PMID 12626685.
