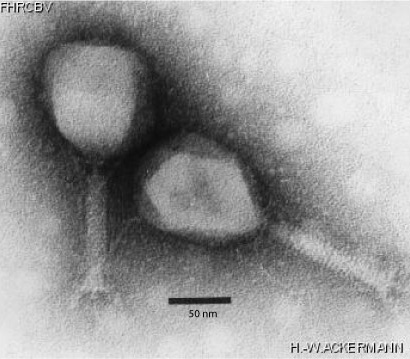
- Electron micrograph of two virions of genus Tequatrovirus

Virus classification
- (unranked): Virus
- Realm: Duplodnaviria
- Kingdom: Heunggongvirae
- Phylum: Uroviricota
- Class: Caudoviricetes
- Order: Pantevenvirales
- Family: Straboviridae
- Subfamily: Tevenvirinae

Genera
- see text

= Tevenvirinae =

Subfamily of viruses

Tevenvirinae is a subfamily of viruses in the family Straboviridae of class Caudoviricetes. The subfamily was previously placed in the morphology-based family Myoviridae, which was found to be paraphyletic in genome studies and abolished in the 2021 International Committee on Taxonomy of Viruses (ICTV) classification. Bacteria and archaea serve as natural hosts. The subfamily contains 16 genera.

== Taxonomy ==
The following genera are recognized:

- Centumtrigintavirus
- Dhakavirus
- Gaprivervirus
- Gelderlandvirus
- Jiaodavirus
- Kagamiyamavirus
- Kanagawavirus
- Karamvirus
- Koserivirus
- Moonvirus
- Mosigvirus
- Mosugukvirus
- Risoevirus
- Tegunavirus
- Tequatrovirus
- Winklervirus

== Structure ==
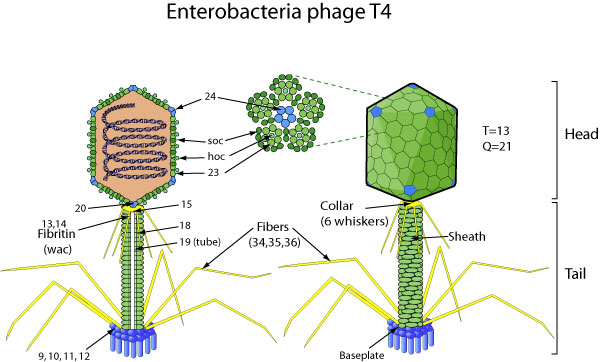
Schematic drawings of a phage virion (species Escherichia virus T4, cross sections and side view)

Viruses in Tevenvirinae are non-enveloped, with head-tail geometries. These viruses are about 70 nm wide and 140 nm long. Genomes are linear, around 170-245kb in length. The genome codes for 300 to 415 proteins.

== Life cycle ==
Viral replication is cytoplasmic. Entry into the host cell is achieved by adsorption into the host cell. DNA-templated transcription is the method of transcription. The virus exits the host cell by lysis, and holin/endolysin/spanin proteins. Bacteria and archaea serve as the natural host. Transmission routes are passive diffusion.
