= Tequatrovirus =

Virus classification
- (unranked): Virus
- Realm: Duplodnaviria
- Kingdom: Heunggongvirae
- Phylum: Uroviricota
- Class: Caudoviricetes
- Order: Pantevenvirales
- Family: Straboviridae
- Subfamily: Tevenvirinae
- Genus: Tequatrovirus

Species
- See text

Synonyms
- T4virus

Genus of viruses

Tequatrovirus is a genus of viruses in subfamily Tevenvirinae of family Straboviridae. Gram-negative bacteria serve as the natural host, with transmission achieved through passive diffusion. There are 83 species in this genus.

== Taxonomy ==
The following species are assigned to the genus:

- Tequatrovirus aplgate
- Tequatrovirus ar1
- Tequatrovirus BMB16
- Tequatrovirus c40
- Tequatrovirus CF2
- Tequatrovirus cm8
- Tequatrovirus cromcrrp10
- Tequatrovirus deeone
- Tequatrovirus e112
- Tequatrovirus ec04
- Tequatrovirus ec121
- Tequatrovirus ecml134
- Tequatrovirus ecnp1
- Tequatrovirus ecombl75
- Tequatrovirus ecomdalca
- Tequatrovirus ecomg28
- Tequatrovirus ecomim339
- Tequatrovirus ecomime340
- Tequatrovirus ecomnbg2
- Tequatrovirus ecomufv133
- Tequatrovirus effone
- Tequatrovirus fps2
- Tequatrovirus fps65
- Tequatrovirus fps90
- Tequatrovirus gee4498
- Tequatrovirus gee4507
- Tequatrovirus gee50
- Tequatrovirus gee9062
- Tequatrovirus geeight
- Tequatrovirus gizh
- Tequatrovirus hy01
- Tequatrovirus hy03
- Tequatrovirus ime09
- Tequatrovirus ime537
- Tequatrovirus kaw
- Tequatrovirus kha5h
- Tequatrovirus kit03
- Tequatrovirus knp5
- Tequatrovirus lutter
- Tequatrovirus mlf4
- Tequatrovirus nbeco
- Tequatrovirus oe5505
- Tequatrovirus ozark
- Tequatrovirus pd112
- Tequatrovirus pe37
- Tequatrovirus pp01
- Tequatrovirus pss1
- Tequatrovirus pst
- Tequatrovirus pyps2t
- Tequatrovirus RB14
- Tequatrovirus RB18
- Tequatrovirus RB27
- Tequatrovirus RB3
- Tequatrovirus RB32
- Tequatrovirus RB51
- Tequatrovirus sf21
- Tequatrovirus sf22
- Tequatrovirus sf23
- Tequatrovirus sf24
- Tequatrovirus sgallinarium
- Tequatrovirus sh7
- Tequatrovirus SHBML501
- Tequatrovirus shfl2
- Tequatrovirus shfml11
- Tequatrovirus shfml26
- Tequatrovirus slur02
- Tequatrovirus slur03
- Tequatrovirus slur07
- Tequatrovirus snuabm
- Tequatrovirus T2
- Tequatrovirus T4 (formerly Escherichia virus T4)
- Tequatrovirus T6
- Tequatrovirus teqdroes
- Tequatrovirus teqhad
- Tequatrovirus teqskov
- Tequatrovirus ufvareg1
- Tequatrovirus vipecoom
- Tequatrovirus vtec
- Tequatrovirus yueel1
- Tequatrovirus zeen18
- Tequatrovirus zeezee23
- Tequatrovirus zeezeesix
- Tequatrovirus zeezeethirty

== Structure ==
Tequatrovirus species are nonenveloped, with a head and tail. The head is a prolate spheroid approximately 120 nm in length and 86 nm in width, with an elongated icosahedral symmetry (T=13, Q=21) composed of 152 total capsomers. The tail has six long terminal fibers, six short spikes, and a small base plate. The tail is enclosed in a sheath, which loosens and slides around the tail core upon contraction.

Genus	Structure	Symmetry	Capsid	Genomic arrangement	Genomic segmentation
Tequatrovirus	Head-Tail	T=13 Q=21	Non-enveloped	Linear	Monopartite

== Genome ==
Genomes are linear, around 169kb in length. The genome codes for 300 proteins. Some species have been fully sequenced and are available from ICTV. They range between 159k and 235k nucleotides, with 242 to 292 proteins. The complete genomes are available from the National Center for Biotechnology Information, along with the complete genomes for dozens of other similar, unclassified virus strains.

== Life cycle ==
Viral replication is cytoplasmic. The virus attaches to the host cell using its terminal fibers, and uses viral exolysin to degrade the cell wall enough to eject the viral DNA into the host cytoplasm via contraction of its tail sheath. DNA-templated transcription is the method of transcription. The virus exits the host cell by lysis, and holin/endolysin/spanin proteins. Once the viral genes have been replicated, the procapsid is assembled and packed. The tail is then assembled and the mature virions are released via lysis. Gram-negative bacteria serve as the natural host. Transmission routes are passive diffusion.

Genus	Host details	Tissue tropism	Entry details	Release details	Replication site	Assembly site	Transmission
Tequatrovirus	Bacteria: gram negative	None	Injection	Lysis	Cytoplasm	Cytoplasm	Passive diffusion

== History ==
The ICTV's first report (1971) included the genus T-even phages, unassigned to an order, family, or subfamily. The genus was renamed in 1976 to T-even phage group, moved into the newly created family Myoviridae in 1981. In 1993, it was renamed again to T4-like phages, and was moved into the newly created order Caudovirales in 1998. The next year (1999), it was renamed to T4-like viruses. Once more, the genus was moved into the newly created subfamily Tevenvirinae in 2010-11, renamed to T4likevirus in 2012, and renamed again to T4virus in 2015. In 2021, the subfamily Tevenvirinae was moved to the new family Straboviridae.
