= Marc Tiffeneau =

French chemist (1873–1945)

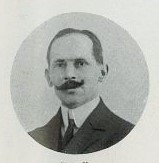
- Marc Tiffeneau
- Born: November 5, 1873; Mouy, France
- Died: May 20, 1945 (aged 71); Paris, France
- Education: École de pharmacie de Paris
- Known for: Tiffeneau-Demjanov rearrangement
- Awards: Prix Jecker, of the Académie des Sciences (1911 and 1923)
- Scientific career
- Fields: Chemistry, Pharmacology
- Workplaces: Faculté de Pharmacie de Paris; Faculté de Médecine de Paris; Hôpitaux de Paris; Académie des Sciences; Académie de Médecine

Marc Émile Pierre Adolphe Tiffeneau (November 5, 1873 – May 20, 1945) was a French chemist who co-discovered the Tiffeneau-Demjanov rearrangement.

In 1899 he graduated from the École de pharmacie de Paris, and afterwards began work as a pharmacy intern in Paris hospitals. In 1904 he was named chief pharmacist at the Hôpital Boucicaut, and from 1927, worked in a similar capacity at the Hôtel-Dieu de Paris. From 1926 to 1944 he was a professor of pharmacology to the faculty of medicine at the Sorbonne.

He also sat as one of the four members of the Drug Supervisory Body (predecessor of the International Narcotics Control Board) from 1933 until his death.

Tiffeneau received his Ph.D. in sciences in 1907 and his Ph.D. in medicine in 1910. He was a member of the Académie Nationale de Médecine (from 1927), dean to the faculty of medicine (1937) and a member of the Académie des Sciences (from 1939). At the time of his death in 1945 he was president of the Société chimique de France.

== Selected works ==
- Le système nerveux autonome sympathique et parasympathique, 1923; (translation of John Newport Langley).
- Abrégé de pharmacologie, 1926, 7th edition 1947.
- Les Amines biologiques, 1934; (preface by Tiffeneau).
- Vade-mecum de médecine pratique, 1940.
