= Straboviridae =

Virus classification
- (unranked): Virus
- Realm: Duplodnaviria
- Kingdom: Heunggongvirae
- Phylum: Uroviricota
- Class: Caudoviricetes
- Order: Pantevenvirales
- Family: Straboviridae

Subfamilies and genera
- see text

Family of viruses

Straboviridae is a family of viruses in the order Pantevenvirales, class Caudoviricetes. The viruses in this family were formerly placed in the morphology-based family Myoviridae, which was found to be paraphyletic in genome studies and abolished in the 2021 International Committee on Taxonomy of Viruses (ICTV) classification, although the term myovirus is still used to refer to the morphology of viruses in this new family. Bacteria and archaea serve as natural hosts. In average, replication of family members is supported by 34% isolates of primary host species. There were 209 species in this family, assigned to 36 genera and three subfamilies.

== Taxonomy ==
The family was erected to contain three subfamilies that were previously placed in the morphology-based family Myoviridae, which was found to be paraphyletic in genome studies and abolished in the 2021 ICTV classification.

The subfamilies and their constituent genera are as follows:

- Subfamily Emmerichvirinae (2 genera)
  - Ceceduovirus
  - Ishigurovirus
- Subfamily Tevenvirinae (16 genera)
  - Centumtrigintavirus
  - Dhakavirus
  - Gaprivervirus
  - Gelderlandvirus
  - Jiaodavirus
  - Kagamiyamavirus
  - Kanagawavirus
  - Karamvirus
  - Koserivirus
  - Moonvirus
  - Mosigvirus
  - Mosugukvirus
  - Risoevirus
  - Tegunavirus
  - Tequatrovirus
  - Winklervirus
- Subfamily Twarogvirinae (5 genera)
  - Acajnonavirus
  - Hadassahvirus
  - Lasallevirus
  - Lazarusvirus
  - Zedzedvirus
- Incertae sedis genera not assigned to a subfamily (14 genera)
  - Angelvirus
  - Biquartavirus
  - Bragavirus
  - Carettavirus
  - Chrysonvirus
  - Cinqassovirus
  - Gualtarvirus
  - Jiangsuvirus
  - Krischvirus
  - Mylasvirus
  - Nanhuvirus
  - Pseudotevenvirus
  - Schizotequatrovirus
  - Slopekvirus
  - Tulanevirus

== See also ==
- Escherichia virus CC31
