= Pantevenvirales =

Virus classification
- (unranked): Virus
- Realm: Duplodnaviria
- Kingdom: Heunggongvirae
- Phylum: Uroviricota
- Class: Caudoviricetes
- Order: Pantevenvirales

Order of viruses

Pantevenvirales is an order of viruses.

== Taxonomy ==
Pantevenvirales contains the following families:

- Ackermannviridae
- Kyanoviridae
- Straboviridae
