= Phage group =

Mid-1900s informal network of biologists

The phage group (sometimes called the American Phage Group) was an informal network of biologists centered on Max Delbrück that contributed heavily to bacterial genetics and the origins of molecular biology in the mid-20th century. The phage group takes its name from bacteriophages, the bacteria-infecting viruses that the group used as experimental model organisms. In addition to Delbrück, important scientists associated with the phage group include: Niels Jerne, Salvador Luria, Alfred Hershey, Seymour Benzer, Charles Steinberg, Gunther Stent, James D. Watson, Frank Stahl, and Renato Dulbecco.

== Origins ==
Bacteriophages have been a subject of experimental investigation since Félix d'Herelle isolated and developed methods for detecting and culturing them, beginning in 1917. Max Delbrück, a physicist-turned biologist seeking the simplest possible experimental system to probe the fundamental laws of life, first encountered phages during a 1937 visit to T. H. Morgan's fly lab at Caltech. Delbrück was unimpressed with Morgan's experimentally complex model organism Drosophila, but another researcher, Emory Ellis, was working with the more elementary phage. During the next few years, Ellis and Delbrück collaborated on methods of counting phage and tracking growth curves; they established the basic step-wise pattern of virus growth.

=== Emory Ellis (1906–2003) and Max Delbrück (1906–1981) ===
In a retrospective article, Emory Ellis stated "Soon after Max Delbrück arrived at the Caltech Biology Division, intent on discovering how his background in physical sciences could be productively applied to biological problems, I showed him some step-growth curves. His first comment was 'I don't believe it.'" However, as Ellis describes, Delbrück soon dispelled this initial reaction of disbelief by his own analysis of the phenomenon, and promptly joined in the work with enthusiasm, bringing to it his training in mathematics and physics, and intense interest in genetics. Their initial collaborative findings were published in 1939.

=== Niels K. Jerne (1911–1994) ===
In the early 1950s, Niels K. Jerne employed bacteriophages—specifically phage T4—as model antigens to study antigen-antibody interactions with greater precision. At the Danish State Serum Institute, Jerne recognized that phage neutralization assays allowed for quantitative measurements of immune responses using extremely small antigen quantities. This system enabled the detection of single virus particles, allowing him to observe the strength and specificity of antibody binding with unprecedented sensitivity.

While using this system, Jerne made a surprising discovery: non-immunized (normal) serum already contained low levels of antibodies capable of inactivating bacteriophage T4. Furthermore, when animals were immunized with the phage, the specific antibody levels rose quickly—suggesting that the immune system possessed a pre-existing repertoire of antibodies that could be amplified upon antigen exposure. These findings challenged the prevailing view that antibodies were synthesized only after antigen stimulation.

Jerne interpreted this as evidence that the body naturally produces a diverse array of antibodies prior to encountering specific antigens. In his 1955 paper, he proposed the "natural selection theory" of antibody formation, arguing that antigens act not by instructing cells to make new antibodies, but by selecting from an existing pool of antibodies and promoting their proliferation. This concept directly influenced the later development of the clonal selection theory and marked a foundational shift in immunological thought.

=== Salvador Luria (1912–1991) and Alfred Hershey (1908–1997) ===
The phage group started around 1940, after Delbrück and Luria had met at a physics conference. Delbrück and Salvador Luria began a series of collaborative experiments on the patterns of infection for different strains of bacteria and bacteriophage. They soon established the "mutual exclusion principle" that an individual bacterium can only be infected by one strain of phage. In 1943, their "fluctuation test", later dubbed the Luria–Delbrück experiment, showed that genetic mutations for phage resistance arise in the absence of selection, rather than being a response to selection. The traditional wisdom among bacteriologists prior to 1943 was that bacteria had no chromosomes and no genes. The Luria–Delbrück experiment showed that bacteria, like other established model genetic organisms, have genes, and that these can spontaneously mutate to generate mutants that may then reproduce to form clonal lineages. That year, they also began working with Alfred Hershey, another phage experimenter. The three would share the 1969 Nobel Prize in Physiology or Medicine, "for work on the replication mechanism and genetics of viruses".

Hershey described retrospectively the circumstances leading to the experiment using phage that he performed with his research assistant, Martha Chase, in 1952, later known as the Hershey–Chase experiment. This experiment provided key evidence that DNA, as distinct from protein, is the genetic material of the phage and therefore the likely genetic material generally.

In 1946, Luria discovered that when, after UV irradiation, two or more "dead" phage entered the same bacterial cell, they often became alive again and produced normal live progeny.a finding that was destined to open up a new insight on how the stability of DNA is achieved. This was the first example of reactivation of cells or organisms that had been damaged by radiation. He interpreted the reactivation, correctly, as a result of genetic recombination. James Watson was Luria's first graduate student at the Indiana University. As his PhD thesis project, Watson showed that X-rayed phage can participate in genetic recombination and multiplicity reactivation.

As remembered by Luria the discovery of reactivation of irradiated phage (referred to as "multiplicity reactivation") immediately started a flurry of activity in the study of repair of radiation damage within the early phage group. It turned out later that the repair of damaged phage by mutual help that Luria had discovered was only one special case of DNA repair. Cells of all types are now known to have complex biochemical processes of DNA repair. DNA repair processes are also now recognized as playing critical roles in protecting against aging, cancer, and infertility.

=== James Watson (1928–2025) and Renato Dulbecco (1914–2012) ===
Jim Watson, in a retrospective article, described his first experiences as a student with Luria in 1947. Apparently, according to Watson "…many students were afraid of Luria who had a reputation of being arrogant toward people who were wrong." However, as the fall term wore on, Watson "saw no evidence of the rumored inconsiderateness toward dimwits." He later asked to do research under Luria's direction, and was given the task of studying X-ray-induced multiplicity reactivation of phage. The only other scientist in Luria's lab at that time, with whom Watson shared a lab bench, was Renato Dulbecco (a future member of the phage group), who had recently arrived from Italy to do experiments on phage multiplicity reactivation. Later that semester, in 1948, Watson met Delbrück who was briefly visiting Luria. Watson wrote "Almost from Delbrück's first sentence, I knew I was not going to be disappointed. He did not beat around the bush and the intent of his words was always clear. But even more important to me was his youthful appearance and spirit." Watson noted that on this occasion, as on many subsequent occasions, Delbrück talked about Niels Bohr and his belief that a complementarity principle, perhaps like that needed for understanding quantum mechanics, would be the key to the real understanding of biology.

In 1950, Renato Dulbecco then at Caltech with Delbrück, worked out a procedure for assaying animal virus particles by their formation of plaques on a sheet of cultured cells, just as phage form plaques on a lawn of bacterial cells. This procedure set the stage for Dulbecco to implement a comprehensive research program for quantitative studies on animal viruses to fathom their intracellular reproductive cycle. This work was recognized by award of the Nobel Prize in 1975.

=== Matthew Meselson (b. 1930) and Franklin Stahl (1929–2025) ===
After the discovery of the structure of DNA in 1953, it was still unclear how DNA replicated. The favored model at the time was semi-conservative replication, but experimental proof was needed. The Meselson–Stahl experiment, performed by Matthew Meselson and Franklin Stahl in 1958, was the key experiment that provided convincing evidence of semi-conservative replication, the mechanism now known to be correct. Meselson and Stahl described the circumstances leading to this key experiment. It has since been described as the "Most Beautiful Experiment in Biology". Its beauty is tied to the simplicity of the result, although the route that led to the experiment was far from simple.

=== Seymour Benzer (1921–2007) and Jean Weigle (1901–1968) ===
As described in a retrospective article, Seymour Benzer joined Delbrück's phage group at Caltech in 1949 as a postdoctoral fellow. There he shared a lab room with Jean Weigle where they did collaborative experiments on phage T4. Upon leaving Caltech, Benzer continued experiments on phage T4 at the Pasteur Institute in Paris and then Purdue University where he developed a system for studying the fine structure of the gene using mutants defective in the rIIA and rIIB genes. These genetic experiments, involving crosses of rII mutants, led to the finding of a unique linear order of mutational sites within the genes. This result provided strong evidence for the key idea that the gene has a linear structure equivalent to a length of DNA with many sites that can independently mutate.

In 1952, Salvador Luria had discovered the phenomenon of "restriction-modification" (the modification of phage growing within an infected bacterium, so that upon their release and re-infection of a related bacterium the phage's growth is restricted). Weigle, working with Giuseppe Bertani and Werner Arber, soon clarified the basis for this phenomenon. They showed that restriction was actually due to attack by specific bacterial enzymes on the modified phage's DNA. This work led to the discovery of the class of enzymes now known as "restriction enzymes". These enzymes allowed controlled manipulation of DNA in the laboratory, thus providing the foundation for the development of genetic engineering.

Weigle also demonstrated the inducible nature of DNA damage-response genes in bacteria, a phenomenon that has come to be known as the SOS response. This response includes DNA damage-inducible mutagenesis (termed Weigle mutagenesis in his honor) and inducible repair following DNA damage (termed Weigle reactivation).

=== Sydney Brenner (1927–2019) and Gunther Stent (1924–2008) ===
In 1961, Sydney Brenner, an early member of the phage group, collaborated with Francis Crick, Leslie Barnett and Richard Watts-Tobin at the Cavendish Laboratory in Cambridge to perform genetic experiments that demonstrated the basic nature of the genetic code for proteins. These experiments, carried out with mutants of the rIIB gene of phage T4, showed, that for a gene that encodes a protein, three sequential bases of the gene's DNA specify each successive amino acid of the protein. Thus the genetic code is a triplet code, where each triplet (called a codon) specifies a particular amino acid. They also obtained evidence that the codons do not overlap with each other in the DNA sequence encoding a protein, and that such a sequence is read from a fixed starting point.

Gunther Stent joined the phage group in 1948 after taking their phage course at Cold Spring Harbor, New York. Informal discussions within the group on the progress of their research led to a book by Stent entitled Molecular Biology of Bacterial Viruses (dedicated to Max Delbrück) which was an account of the accomplishments in the field up to 1963. Later, in his 1998 memoirs, Stent described some of the activities and personal interactions that illustrated the unique intellectual spirit of the phage group during its early crucial years (1948-1950).

=== Max Delbrück ===
Delbrück brought many biologists and physicists into phage research in the early 1940s. In 1944, Delbrück promoted the "Phage Treaty", a call for phage researchers to focus on a limited number of phage and bacterial strains, with standardized experimental conditions. This helped to make research from different laboratories more easily comparable and replicable, helping to unify the field of bacterial genetics.

== Phage course at Cold Spring Harbor Laboratory and at Caltech ==
Apart from direct collaborations, the main legacy of the phage group resulted from the yearly summer phage course taught at Cold Spring Harbor Laboratory and taught sporadically at Caltech. Beginning in 1945, Delbrück and others taught young biologists the fundamentals of phage biology and experimentation, instilling the phage group's distinctive math- and physics-oriented approach to biology. Many of the leaders of the emerging field of molecular biology were alumni of the phage course, which continued to be taught through the 1950s and 1960s.

In 1995, Millard Susman published a retrospective article on the phage course as it was given over the years (1945–1970) both at Cold Spring Harbor (New York) and at the California Institute of Technology. The article lists many of the graduates of the course, describes some of their accomplishments, and provides interesting anecdotes related to the course. Richard Feynman, the distinguished Caltech theoretical physicist, learned how to work with phage during the summer of 1961 with the help of Charles M. Steinberg.

== Conditional lethal mutants ==
The isolation of conditional lethal mutants of phage during 1962-1964 by the phage group members provided an opportunity to study the function of virtually all of the genes that are essential for growth of the phage under laboratory conditions. One class of conditional lethal mutants is known as amber mutants. These mutants were isolated and genetically characterized by Richard Epstein, Antoinette Bolle, and Charles M. Steinberg in 1962 (although publication of their initial findings was delayed for 50 years). A more complete genetic characterization of the amber mutants was described by Epstein et al. in 1964. Another class of conditional lethal mutants, referred to as temperature-sensitive mutants, was obtained by Robert Edgar and Ilga Lielausis. Studies of these two classes of mutants led to considerable insight into numerous fundamental biologic problems. Thus understanding was gained on the functions and interactions of the proteins employed in the machinery of DNA replication, repair and recombination, and on how viruses are assembled from protein and nucleic acid components (molecular morphogenesis). The role of chain terminating codons was also elucidated. One noteworthy study was performed by Sydney Brenner and collaborators using amber mutants defective in the gene encoding the major head protein of phage T4. This experiment provided strong evidence for the widely held, but prior to 1964 still unproven, "sequence hypothesis" that the amino acid sequence of a protein is specified by the nucleotide sequence of the gene determining the protein. Thus, this study demonstrated the co-linearity of the gene with its encoded polypeptide.
