= Meselsohn =

Meselsohn or Meselson is a surname. Notable people with the surname include:

- Boiler Room (band) - members James Meselsohn and Mike Meselsohn
- Matthew Meselson, geneticist
- Amy Meselson, lawyer, daughter of Matthew
