= Alfred Hershey =

American bacteriologist and geneticist (1908–1997)

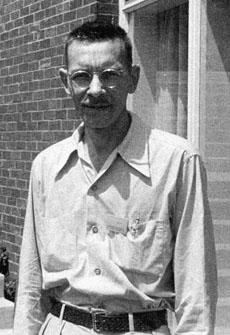
- Born: Alfred Day Hershey; December 4, 1908; Owosso, Michigan, US
- Died: May 22, 1997 (aged 88); Syosset, New York, US
- Education: Michigan State University
- Known for: Proof of DNA as genetic material of life
- Awards: Albert Lasker Award for Basic Medical Research (1958); Nobel Prize in Physiology or Medicine (1969)
- Scientific career
- Fields: Bacteriology, genetics, DNA
- Workplaces: Washington University School of Medicine

Alfred Day Hershey (December 4, 1908 – May 22, 1997) was an American Nobel Prize–winning bacteriologist and geneticist.

== Early years ==
Hershey was born in Owosso, Michigan to Robert Day and Alma Wilbur Hershey. He earned a B.S. in chemistry in 1930, and Ph.D. in bacteriology in 1934 from Michigan State University. Shortly after, Hershey accepted a faculty position at Washington University in St. Louis, serving as an instructor of bacteriology and immunology from 1934 to 1950.

== Bacteriophage research ==
At Washington University, Hershey worked closely with department head Jacques Bronfenbrenner to investigate bacteriophages, or phages—viruses that infect and replicate inside bacteria. Hershey's work on the factors impacting the virus' ability to infect its targets brought him to the attention of fellow phage researchers Max Delbrück and Salvador Luria.

=== The Phage Group ===
In 1943, Delbrück invited Hershey to Vanderbilt University to discuss his phage research. Together, with Luria, they would form the core of an informal network of researchers called "the Phage group". Three years later, Hershey and Delbrück would independently discover that different strains of bacteriophage can both exchange genetic material when infecting the same bacterial cell. This process results in hybrid phages containing genetic material from both sources, which Hershey referred to as "genetic recombination".

Hershey left Washington University in 1950 for the Department of Genetics of the Carnegie Institution of Washington, a predecessor of Cold Spring Harbor Laboratory. Two years later, he and Martha Chase would conduct the famous Hershey–Chase, or "Waring Blender" experiment. Their work confirmed that DNA, not protein, was the genetic material of life.

== Later years and death ==
In 1962, Hershey was named director of the Department of Genetics, a position he held until his retirement in 1970. He would live on the grounds of Cold Spring Harbor Laboratory for the rest of his life.

Hershey's work with bacteriophage would earn him a share of the 1969 Nobel Prize in Physiology or Medicine with Delbrück and Luria, "for their discoveries concerning the replication mechanism and the genetic structure of viruses."

Although officially retired from scientific research, Hershey would continue to pursue new projects. In 1971, he edited The Bacteriophage λ, an extensive volume on the subject, published by CSHL Press that same year. In 1981, Hershey became a founding member of the World Cultural Council.

Hershey died from congestive heart failure on May 22, 1997 at his home in Laurel Hollow, New York. He was 88 years old. At the time, he was survived by his wife Harriet Davidson (1918–2000) and their only child, Peter Manning Hershey (1956–1999).

Following his death, Frank Stahl, a member of The Phage Group, wrote: "The Phage Church, as we were sometimes called (see Phage group), was led by the Trinity of Delbrück, Luria, and Hershey. Delbrück's status as founder and his ex cathedra manner made him the pope, of course, and Luria was the hard-working, socially sensitive priest-confessor. And Al (Hershey) was the saint."
