= Franklin Stahl =

American molecular biologist (1929–2025)

- Born: Franklin William Stahl; October 8, 1929; Boston, Massachusetts, U.S.
- Died: April 2, 2025 (aged 95); Eugene, Oregon, U.S.
- Education: Harvard University (BA); University of Rochester (PhD)
- Known for: Meselson-Stahl experiment
- Spouse: Mary Morgan (m. 1955; died 1996)
- Partner: Henriette M. Foss (died 2022)
- Children: 3
- Awards: Thomas Hunt Morgan Medal, and others
- Scientific career
- Fields: Molecular biology Genetics
- Workplaces: University of Missouri, University of Oregon
- Academic advisors: Giuseppe Bertani

Franklin William Stahl (October 8, 1929 – April 2, 2025) was an American molecular biologist and geneticist. With Matthew Meselson, Stahl conducted the famous Meselson-Stahl experiment showing that DNA is replicated by a semiconservative mechanism, meaning that each strand of the DNA serves as a template for production of a new strand.

Stahl was a professor of biology at the University of Oregon's Institute of Molecular Biology in Eugene, Oregon.

== Background ==
Stahl was born in Boston, Massachusetts on October 28, 1929, and grew up in nearby Needham, Massachusetts. Like his two older sisters, graduated from the public schools of Needham. In 1951, he was awarded an AB degree in biology from Harvard College, and matriculated in the biology department of the University of Rochester. His interest in genetics was cemented in 1952 by his introduction to bacterial viruses (phages) in a course taught by A. H. (Gus) Doermann at the Cold Spring Harbor Biological Laboratory. In 1956, he received a PhD in biology for his work with Doermann on the genetics of T4 phage. In 1955, he undertook postdoctoral studies with Giuseppe Bertani (in the Phage group) at Caltech (Pasadena) with the aim of learning some bacterial genetics.

== Career ==
Stahl subsequently turned his attentions to collaborations with Charley Steinberg and Matt Meselson. With Steinberg, he undertook mathematical analyses of T4 growth, mutation, and genetic recombination. With Meselson, he studied DNA replication in Escherichia coli. That study produced strong support for the semiconservative model proposed by Jim Watson and Francis Crick.

For one year, Stahl served on the zoology faculty at the University of Missouri in Columbia, Missouri before accepting, in 1959, a position in the new Institute of Molecular Biology at the University of Oregon in Eugene. In the succeeding years, his research involved the phages T4 and Lambda and the budding yeast, Saccharomyces cerevisiae, with his primary focus on genetic recombination. He taught various genetics courses at Oregon and presented phage courses in America, Italy and India. He undertook sabbatical studies in Cambridge, UK, Edinburgh, Jerusalem, and Cambridge, Massachusetts.

Stahl's research was undertaken in association with numerous colleagues, especially his long-term associates Jean M. Crasemann (1921–1992), Mary M. Stahl (1935–1996), and Henriette (Jette) M. Foss (1937–2022). After his retirement in 2001, he lived with Jette and four llamas in Eugene, where he continued to submit research papers and participated in University of Oregon governance.

Stahl's post-retirement activities included assisting the U.S. Department of Justice in identifying the 2017 Jewish Community Center anti-Semitic bomb threat perpetrators. This inquiry led Stahl to solve the inexplicable presence of silica and iron in the 2001 anthrax letters. The details are set forth in Stahl v. FBI, Civil No. 1:23-cv-02918-JMC (D.C. District Court 2024).

== Personal life and death ==
In 1955, Stahl married Mary Morgan, after they had only dated for a week. They had three children and were married until her death in 1996. He later entered a relationship with Henriette "Jette" Foss (died 2022); between them, they shared five children (plus spouses) and eight grandchildren.

On April 2, 2025, Stahl died from heart failure at his home in Eugene, Oregon, at the age of 95. His death was not publicly reported until July 2025.

== Experimental contributions ==
In bacteria:

- With M. Meselson, the demonstration of semiconservative DNA replication.

In phage T4:

- With H. Foss and others, demonstrations of genetic linkage circularity and its relation to genetic heterozygosis.
- With N. Murray and others, the determination, by genetic methods, of the direction of mRNA synthesis on cotranscribed pairs of genes.

In Lambda:

- With M. Stahl and others, the discovery and analysis of the genetic element, Chi, that stimulates nearby genetic recombination in bacteria.
- With M. Stahl and others, the mutual dependence of DNA replication and genetic recombination. These studies utilized the method of density gradient centrifugation that was developed for the test of the semiconservative model of DNA replication.

In Yeast:

- With H. Foss and others, the demonstration of two functional pathways for genetic recombination in wild-type budding yeast.

== Theoretical contributions ==
- With C. Steinberg, formulations of phage growth, recombination and mutation.
- With J. Szostak and others, the interpretation of genetic recombination in terms of the repair of double-strand DNA breaks.
- With R. Lande, E. Housworth and others, mathematical formalizations of recombination in higher organisms.

== Selected honors ==
1997- Fellow, American Academy of Microbiology

1996 Thomas Hunt Morgan Medal (from Genetics Society of America)

1986- Associate Member EMBO

1985- American Cancer Society Research Professor

1985-1990 MacArthur Fellow

1981- Member, American Academy of Arts and Sciences

1976- Member, National Academy of Sciences

1975-76; 1985-1986 Guggenheim Fellow

1969-70 NIH Special Postdoctoral Fellowship

Honorary Doctor of Science: Oakland University and University of Rochester
