= Gunther Stent =

American biologist (1924–2008)

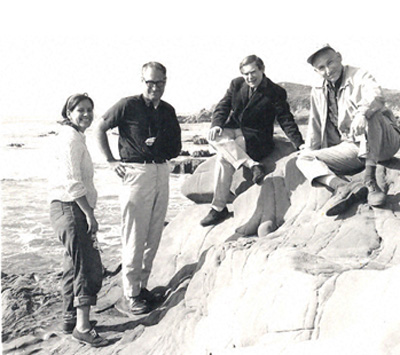
- E. Lederberg, G. Stent, S. Brenner, J. Lederberg, 1965
- Born: Günter Siegmund Stensch; March 28, 1924; Berlin, Germany
- Died: June 12, 2008 (aged 84); Haverford, Pennsylvania, US
- Education: University of Illinois
- Known for: Molecular Biology of Bacterial Viruses
- Scientific career
- Fields: Molecular biology
- Workplaces: California Institute of Technology, University of California, Berkeley

Gunther Siegmund Stent (March 28, 1924 – June 12, 2008) was a German-American molecular biologist and professor at the University of California, Berkeley. An early bacteriophage researcher associated with the phage group that formed around Max Delbrück at the California Institute of Technology, he was known for his influential textbook Molecular Biology of Bacterial Viruses (1963), his studies on the metabolism of bacteria and the neurobiology of leeches, and his writings on the history and philosophy of science.

Born in Berlin, Stent emigrated to the United States in 1940 to escape Nazi Germany. He was a member of the American Academy of Arts and Sciences, the United States National Academy of Sciences, and the American Philosophical Society.

== Life and career ==
Stent was born Günter Siegmund Stensch in Berlin, Germany. In 1940, he emigrated to the United States to escape Nazi Germany, crossing the border over a snow-covered mountain, as he later recounted in his autobiography. He settled in Chicago and changed his surname. He received his BS (1945) and PhD (1948) from the University of Illinois.

In 1949, Stent joined the phage group that had formed around Max Delbrück at the California Institute of Technology in Pasadena. This group served as the incubator for many fundamental ideas in the emerging field of molecular biology. Drawing on discussions among group members, Stent wrote Molecular Biology of Bacterial Viruses (1963), dedicated to Delbrück, which surveyed the state of the field at that time. His later textbook Molecular Genetics: an Introductory Narrative (1971) was translated into Italian, Japanese, Russian, and Spanish.

Beyond molecular biology, Stent wrote on the history and philosophy of science. His 1969 Berkeley lectures were published as The Coming of the Golden Age: A View of the End of Progress.

Stent was elected to the American Academy of Arts and Sciences, the United States National Academy of Sciences, and the American Philosophical Society. He died of pneumonia on June 12, 2008, at the age of 84.

== Publications ==
=== Molecular biology ===
- Stent, G. S. – Molecular Biology of Bacterial Viruses. WH Freeman and Co., San Francisco, CA. OCLC 268815 (1963)
- Stent, G. S. – Molecular Genetics: an Introductory Narrative. San Francisco: W.H. Freeman (1971)
  - Italian translation: Stent, G. S., & Stent, G. S. – Genetica molecolare. Bologna, Italy: Zanichelli (1977)
  - Russian translation: Stent, G. S., Calendar, R., & Stent, G. S. – Molekuli︠a︡rnai︠a︡ genetika. Moskva: Izd-vo MIR (1981)
  - Spanish translation: Stent, G. S. – Genética molecular. Barcelona: Omega (1981)
  - Japanese translation: Stent, G. S., Calendar, R., & Nagano, K. – 分子遺伝学. Bunshi idengaku 岩波書店 (1983)
- Muller, K. J., Nicholls, J. G., & Stent, G. S. – Neurobiology of the Leech. Cold Spring Harbor, N.Y.: Cold Spring Harbor Laboratory (1981)
- Stent, G. S. – Nazis, Women, and Molecular Biology: Memoirs of a Lucky Self-hater. Kensington, Calif: Briones Books (1998)

=== Philosophy of science ===
- Stent, G. S. – The coming of the Golden Age: A View of the End of Progress. Garden City, N.Y.: Published for the American Museum of Natural History [by] the Natural History Press (1969)
  - French translation: Stent, G. S., & Bourdet, C. – L'Avènement de l'âge d'or. L'humanité au carrefour de son évolution [Paris]: Fayard (1973)
- Stent, G. S. – Paradoxes of progress. San Francisco: W.H. Freeman (1978)
  - Spanish translation: Stent, G. S. – Las paradojas del progreso. Barcelona: Salvat (1986)
- Stent, G. S. – Morality As a Biological Phenomenon: The Pre-suppositions of Sociobiological Research. Berkeley: University of California Press (1980)
- Stent, G. S., & Ogawa, M. – 真理>と悟り: 科学の形而上学と東洋哲学 Shinri to satori kagaku no keijijōgaku to tōyō tetsugaku. 朝日出版社, Tōkyō: Asahishuppansha (1981)
- Delbrück, M., & Stent, G. S. – Mind from matter? An Essay on Evolutionary Epistemology. Palo Alto, Calif: Blackwell Scientific Publications (1986)
  - German translation: Delbrück, M., Fischer, E. P., & Stent, G. S. – Wahrheit und Wirklichkeit über die Evolution des Erkennens. Hamburg: Rasch und Röhring Verlag (1986)
  - Spanish translation: Delbrück, M., Stent, S. G., & Casadesús, J. – Mente y materia ensayo de epistemología evolutiva. Alianza Universidad, 616. Madrid: Alianza (1989)
- Stent, G. S. – "Paradoxes of free will". Transactions of the American Philosophical Society, v. 92, pt. 6. Philadelphia: American Philosophical Society (2002)

=== Books edited ===
- Cairns, J., G. Stent, and J. D. Watson – Phage and the Origins of Molecular Biology. Cold Spring Harbor Laboratory Press, Cold Spring Harbor, NY. OCLC 712215 (1966)
  - German translation: Cairns, J., Geissler, E., Stent, G. S., Thomas-Petersein, G., & Watson, J. D. – Phagen und die Entwicklung der Molekularbiologie Hrsg. v. John Cairns (1972)
- Stent, G. S. – Morality As a Biological Phenomenon: Report of the Dahlem Workshop on Biology and Morals, Berlin 1977, November 28 to December 2. Life Sciences Research Report, 9. Berlin: Dahlem Konferenzen (1978)
- Watson, J. D., & Stent, G. S. – The Double Helix: a Personal Account of the Discovery of the Structure of DNA. New York: Norton (1980)
- Cairns, J., G. Stent, and J. D. Watson – Phage and the Origins of Molecular Biology (expanded edition). Cold Spring Harbor Laboratory Press, Cold Spring Harbor, NY. OCLC 25872929 (1992)
- John Cairns, G. Stent, and J. D. Watson, eds. – Phage and the Origins of Molecular Biology (40th anniversary edition). Cold Spring Harbor Laboratory Press, Cold Spring Harbor, NY, ISBN 0-87969-800-4 (2007)
