= Delbrück scattering =

Deflection of high-energy photons

Delbrück scattering, the deflection of high-energy photons in the Coulomb field of nuclei as a consequence of vacuum polarization, was observed in 1975. The related process of the scattering of light by light, also a consequence of vacuum polarization, was not observed until 1998. In both cases, it is a process described by quantum electrodynamics.

== Discovery ==
From 1932 to 1937, Max Delbrück worked in Berlin as an assistant to Lise Meitner, who was collaborating with Otto Hahn on the results of irradiating uranium with neutrons. During this period he wrote a few papers, one of which turned out to be an important contribution on the scattering of gamma rays by a Coulomb field due to polarization of the vacuum produced by that field (1933). His conclusion proved to be theoretically sound but inapplicable to the case in point, but 20 years later Hans Bethe confirmed the phenomenon and named it "Delbrück scattering".

In 1953, Robert Wilson observed Delbrück scattering of 1.33 MeV gamma-rays by the electric fields of lead nuclei.

== Description ==
Delbrück scattering is the coherent elastic scattering of photons in the Coulomb field of heavy nuclei. It is one of the two nonlinear effects of quantum electrodynamics (QED) in the Coulomb field investigated experimentally. The other is the splitting of a photon into two photons. Delbrück scattering was introduced by Max Delbrück in order to explain discrepancies between experimental and predicted data in a Compton scattering experiment on heavy atoms carried out by Meitner and Kösters. Delbrück's arguments were based on the relativistic quantum mechanics of Dirac according to which the QED vacuum is filled with electrons of negative energy or – in modern terms – with electron-positron pairs. These electrons of negative energy should be capable of producing coherent-elastic photon scattering because the recoil momentum during absorption and emission of the photon is transferred to the total atom while the electrons remain in their state of negative energy. This process is the analog of atomic Rayleigh scattering with the only difference that in the latter case the electrons are bound in the electron cloud of the atom. The experiment of Meitner and Kösters was the first in a series of experiments where the discrepancy between experimental and predicted differential cross sections for elastic scattering by heavy atoms were interpreted in terms of Delbrück scattering. From the present point of view these early results are not trustworthy. Reliable investigations were possible only after modern QED techniques based on Feynman diagrams were available for quantitative predictions, and on the experimental side photon detectors with high energy resolution and high detection efficiency had been developed. This was the case at the beginning of the 1970s when also computers with high computing capacity were in operation which delivered numerical results for Delbrück scattering amplitudes with sufficient precision.

The Feynman diagram of Delbrück scattering. The wavy line represents a photon and the double line an electron in the external field of a nucleus.

The lowest order diagram has four vertices and consists of two incoming photons, which annihilate into a virtual electron-positron pair, which then annihilates into two real photons again.

A first observation of Delbrück scattering was achieved in a high-energy, small-angle photon scattering experiment carried out at DESY (Germany) in 1973, where only the imaginary part of the scattering amplitude is of importance. Agreement was obtained with predictions of Cheng Wu which later were verified by Milstein and Strakhovenko. These latter authors make use of the quasi-classical approximation being very different from the one of Cheng and Wu. It could however be shown that both approximations are equivalent and lead to the same numerical results. The essential breakthrough came with the Göttingen (Germany) experiment in 1975 carried out at an energy of 2.754 MeV. In the Göttingen experiment Delbrück scattering was observed as the dominant contribution to the coherent-elastic scattering process, in addition to minor contributions stemming from atomic Rayleigh scattering and nuclear Rayleigh scattering. This experiment was the first where exact predictions based on Feynman diagrams, were confirmed with high precision and, therefore, has to be considered as the first definite observation of Delbrück scattering. For a comprehensive description of the present status of Delbrück scattering see. Nowadays, the most accurate measurements of high-energy Delbrück scattering are performed at the Budker Institute of Nuclear Physics (BINP) in Novosibirsk (Russia). The experiment where photon splitting was really observed for the first time was also performed at the BINP.

There are a number of experimental works published previously to the 1975 Göttingen experiment (or even to the Desy 1973 one). Most notable Jackson and Wetzel in 1969 and Moreh and Kahane in 1973. In both these works use was made of higher energy gamma rays compared with the Göttingen one, conferring a higher contribution of the Delbrück scattering to the overall measured cross section. In general, in the low energy nuclear physics region i.e. <10–20 MeV, a Delbrück experiment measures a number of competing coherent processes including also Rayleigh scattering from electrons, Thomson scattering from the point nucleus and nuclear excitation via the giant dipole resonance. Apart from the Thomson scattering which is well known, the other two (namely Rayleigh and GDR) have considerable uncertainties. The interference of these effects with Delbrück is by no means "minor" (again "at classical nuclear physics energies"). Even at very forward scattering angles, where Delbrück is very strong, there is a substantial interference with the Rayleigh scattering, the amplitudes of both effects being of the same order of magnitude.
