= Amy Meselson =

American lawyer

Amy Valor Meselson
- Born: December 4, 1971; Boston, Massachusetts, U.S.
- Died: July 22, 2018 (aged 46); New York City, U.S.
- Education: Brown University (BA, Philosophy); Harvard University (MA, Philosophy); Yale Law School (JD)
- Occupation: Immigration lawyer
- Known for: Managing attorney at Immigrant Justice Corps
- Parent(s): Matthew Meselson, Sarah Page Meselson

Amy Valor Meselson (December 4, 1971 – July 22, 2018) was the managing lawyer for the New York City-based Immigrant Justice Corps.

She worked in the immigration law unit of New York's Legal Aid Society from 2002, helping then-high school student Amadou Ly and other migrant children. In 2016 she traveled to Greece to volunteer at a Syrian refugee camp. She was managing attorney for the Immigrant Justice Corps when she died by suicide at home on July 22, 2018. In addition to the depression she had been battling since she was a child, The Independent wrote, "She had also recently been diagnosed with extreme anxiety and attention deficit disorder, conditions that may have been exacerbated by the time she spent at the camp."

== Family and education ==
Born in Boston to Matthew and Sarah Page Meselson, she received her Bachelor's degree from Brown University and a Master's from Harvard University, both in philosophy. She received her J.D. from Yale.
