= Matthew Meselson =

American geneticist and molecular biologist (born 1930)

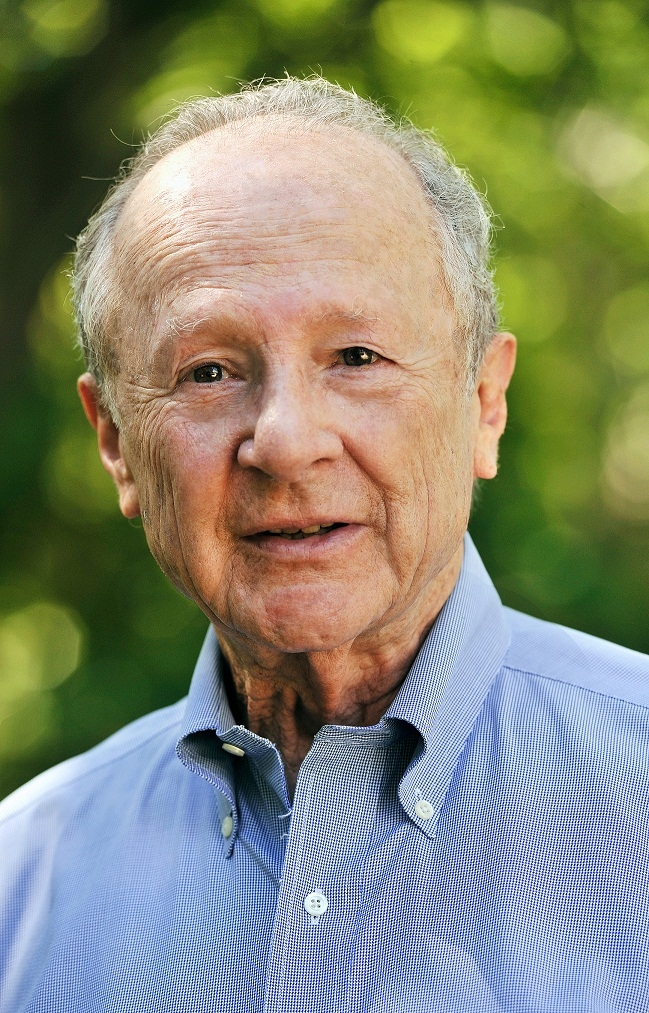
- Born: Matthew Stanley Meselson; May 24, 1930 (age 96); Denver, Colorado, U.S.
- Education: University of Chicago (Ph.B., 1951); California Institute of Technology (Ph.D., 1957)
- Known for: Meselson–Stahl experiment; Discovery of messenger RNA; Discovery of restriction enzymes; Biological Weapons Convention (1972); Yellow rain
- Awards: Guggenheim Fellowship, MacArthur Fellows Program Genius Award, Genetics Society of America - Thomas Hunt Morgan Medal for lifetime contributions, Lasker Award for Special Achievement in Medical Science
- Scientific career
- Fields: Genetics; Biochemistry; Molecular biology
- Workplaces: Harvard University (1960-present); Central Intelligence Agency
- Thesis: I. Equilibrium sedimentation of macromolecules in density gradients with application to the study of deoxyribonucleic acid. II. The crystal structure of N,N-dimethyl malonamide (1957)
- Doctoral advisor: Linus Pauling
- Notable students: Mark Ptashne, Susan Lindquist, Richard I. Morimoto, Sidney Altman, Nancy Kleckner, Steven Henikoff

Matthew Stanley Meselson (born May 24, 1930) is an American geneticist and molecular biologist currently at Harvard University, known for his demonstration, with Franklin Stahl, of semi-conservative DNA replication. After completing his Ph.D. under Linus Pauling at the California Institute of Technology, Meselson became a Professor at Harvard University in 1960, where he has remained today as Professor of the Natural Sciences.

In the famous Meselson–Stahl experiment of 1958 he and Frank Stahl demonstrated through nitrogen isotope labeling that DNA is replicated semi-conservatively. In addition, Meselson, François Jacob, and Sydney Brenner discovered the existence of messenger RNA in 1961. Meselson has investigated DNA repair in cells and how cells recognize and destroy foreign DNA, and, with Werner Arber, was responsible for the discovery of restriction enzymes.

Since 1963 Meselson has been interested in chemical and biological defense and arms control, has served as a consultant on this subject to various government agencies. Meselson worked with Henry Kissinger under the Nixon administration to convince President Richard Nixon to renounce biological weapons, suspend chemical weapons production, and support an international treaty prohibiting the acquisition of biological agents for hostile purposes, which in 1972 became known as the Biological Weapons Convention.

Meselson has received the Award in Molecular Biology from the National Academy of Sciences, the Public Service Award of the Federation of American Scientists, the Presidential Award of the New York Academy of Sciences, the 1995 Thomas Hunt Morgan Medal of the Genetics Society of America, as well as the Lasker Award for Special Achievement in Medical Science. His laboratory at Harvard currently investigates the biological and evolutionary nature of sexual reproduction, genetic recombination, and aging. Many of his past students are notable biologists, including Nobel Laureate Sidney Altman, as well as Mark Ptashne, Susan Lindquist, Stephen F. Heinemann, and Richard I. Morimoto.

== Early life and education ==
Meselson was born in Denver, Colorado, on May 24, 1930, and attended elementary and high school in Los Angeles, California. While a young child he was interested in chemistry and physics, and conducted many experiments in the natural sciences at home. During World War II, Meselson attended summer school during summer vacations and received enough high school credits to graduate a year and a half ahead of time. When he attempted to acquire his diploma from the registrar at his high school, however, he was informed that in order to receive his high school diploma, he needed three full years of physical education, which he lacked. After searching for options, he enrolled at the University of Chicago at the age of 16 in 1946 intending to study chemistry, since it did not require a high school diploma to attend.

=== Higher education ===
Upon arrival the University of Chicago and realizing that the university had abolished bachelor's degrees in specialized field such as chemistry and physics, Meselson studied liberal arts, including history and classics, as an undergraduate from 1946 to 1949. After completing his studies, Meselson spent half a year traveling in Europe, where he spent most of his time reading and making friends. The devastation of the war was still evident in Europe in 1949, as were the beginning tensions of the Cold War. The following year, Meselson returned to Caltech to begin freshman studies again, but disliked the pedagogical approach in most of the courses he took. He enrolled, however, in Linus Pauling's freshman chemistry course, and worked on a project for Pauling the same year on hemoglobin structure.

Meselson subsequently returned to the University of Chicago for a year to enroll in courses in chemistry, physics, and math, though he did not receive another degree. The following year, he was accepted into a graduate physics program at the University of California at Berkeley where he remained for a year. In the summer of 1953, Meselson was at a swimming pool party at the Pauling home in Sierra Madre (he was friends with Pauling's son Peter and with his daughter Linda), and Pauling asked him what he intended to do the following year. Upon hearing Meselson respond that he intended to return to the University of Chicago, Pauling immediately asked him to come to Caltech to begin graduate studies with him, to which Meselson agreed. As a graduate student of Linus Pauling in chemistry at the California Institute of Technology (1953-1957), Meselson's doctoral dissertation was on equilibrium density gradient centrifugation and on x-ray crystallography. Besides Pauling, Meselson's dissertation committee also included Jerome Vinograd, Richard Feynman, and Harden M. McConnell. Meselson then served as Assistant Professor of Physical Chemistry and then Senior Research Fellow at Caltech until he joined the Harvard faculty in 1960.

== Research ==
In 1957, Meselson and Franklin Stahl (as part of the phage group) showed that DNA replicates semi-conservatively. In order to test hypotheses for how DNA replicates, Meselson and Stahl, together with Jerome Vinograd, invented a method that separates macromolecules according to their buoyant density. The method, equilibrium density gradient centrifugation, was sufficiently sensitive that Meselson and Stahl were able to separate DNA containing the heavy isotope of nitrogen, ^{15}N, from DNA made of the lighter isotope, ^{14}N. In their classic experiment, described and analyzed in a book by science historian Frederic L. Holmes, they grew the bacterium Escherichia coli for many generations in medium containing ^{15}N as the only nitrogen source and then switched the bacteria to growth medium containing ^{14}N instead. They extracted DNA from bacteria prior to switching and, at intervals, for several generations thereafter. After one generation of growth, all the DNA was seen to have a density halfway between that of ^{15}N DNA and ^{14}N DNA. In successive generations, the fraction of DNA that was "half-heavy" fell by a factor of ½, as the total amount of DNA increased two-fold. When the half-heavy DNA was made single stranded by heating, it separated into two density species, one heavy (containing only ^{15}N) and one light (containing only ^{14}N). The experiment implied that, upon replication, the two complementary strands of the bacterial DNA separate, and that each of the single strands directs the synthesis of a new, complementary strand, a result that verified the suggestion for DNA replication put forward five years earlier by James Watson and Francis Crick and lent important early support for the Watson-Crick model of the DNA molecule.

In collaboration with Jean Weigle, Meselson then applied the density gradient method to studies of genetic recombination in the bacteriophage Lambda. The question was whether such recombination involved breakage of the recombining DNA molecules or cooperative synthesis of new molecules. The question could be answered by examining phage particles derived from co-infection of bacteria with genetically marked Lambda phages that were labeled with heavy isotopes (^{13}C and ^{15}N). The density-gradient method allowed individual progeny phages to be characterized for their inheritance of parental DNA and of parental genetic makers. Meselson's initial demonstration of breakage-associated, replication-independent recombination was later found to reflect the activity of a special system that can recombine Lambda DNA at only one spot, normally used by the phage to insert itself into the chromosome of a host cell. Subsequently, variations of the experiment by Franklin Stahl revealed reciprocal dependencies between DNA replication and most genetic recombination. With Charles Radding, Meselson developed a model for recombination between DNA duplexes that guided research in the field for the decade from 1973 to 1983.

In 1961, Sydney Brenner, François Jacob and Meselson used the density-gradient method to demonstrate the existence of messenger RNA. In subsequent work, Meselson and his students demonstrated the enzymatic basis of host-directed restriction, a process by which cells recognize and destroy foreign DNA and then predicted and demonstrated methyl-directed mismatch repair, a process that enables cells to correct mistakes in replicating DNA. Meselson's current research is aimed at understanding the advantage of sexual reproduction in evolution. Meselson and his colleagues have recently demonstrated that bdelloid rotifers do, in fact, engage in sexual reproduction employing meiosis of an atypical sort.

=== Meselson effect ===
When two alleles, or copies of a gene, within an asexual diploid individual evolve independently of each other, they become increasingly different over time. This phenomenon of allelic divergence was first described by William Birky, but is more commonly known as the Meselson effect. In sexual organisms, the processes of recombination and independent assortment allow both of the alleles within an individual to descend from a recent single ancestral allele. Without recombination or independent assortment, alleles cannot descend from a recent ancestral allele. Instead the alleles share a last common allelic ancestor at or just preceding the loss of meiotic recombination. A striking example of this effect was described in bdelloid rotifers, in which the two alleles of the lea gene have diverged into two different genes which work together to preserve the organism during periods of dehydration. The Meselson effect should cause entire copies of an organism's genome to diverge from each other, effectively reducing all anciently asexual organisms to a haploid state, in a process similar to the diploidization following whole genome duplication.

However, gene conversion, a form of recombination common in asexual organisms, may prevent the Meselson effect from occurring in young asexual organisms and may limit the effect in bdelloid rotifers. Moreover, a number of putative examples of the Meselson effect remain controversial because other biological process, such as hybridation, can mimic the Meselson effect.

== Chemical and biological weapons defense and disarmament ==
In 1963 Meselson served as a resident consultant in the US Arms Control and Disarmament Agency, where he became interested in chemical and biological weapons programs and policies. Since then he has been involved in chemical and biological weapons defense and disarmament matters as a consultant to various US government agencies and through the Harvard Sussex Program, an academic research organization based at Harvard and at the University of Sussex in the UK of which he and Julian Perry Robinson in the UK are co-directors.

Concluding that biological weapons served no substantial military purpose for the US and that their proliferation would pose a serious threat and that, in years ahead, the exploitation of advanced biology for hostile purposes would be inimical to society generally, he worked to persuade members of the Executive Branch, the Congress and the public that the US had no need for such weapons and that there would be benefits in renouncing them and working for worldwide prohibition. After President Richard Nixon in 1969 canceled the US BW offensive program and endorsed a UK proposal for an international ban, Meselson was among those who successfully advocated international agreements to ban biological and then chemical weapons, leading to the Biological Weapons Convention of 1972 and the Chemical Weapons Convention of 1993.

Meselson and his colleagues have undertaken three on-site investigations with implications for chemical and biological weapons arms control. During August and September 1970, on behalf of the American Association for the Advancement of Science, Meselson led a team in the Republic of Vietnam in a pilot study of the ecological and health effects of the military use of herbicides. Upon returning to Harvard, he and Robert Baughman developed an advanced mass-spectrometric method for analysis of the toxic herbicide contaminant dioxin and applied it to environmental and biomedical samples from the Vietnam and the US. In December 1970, President Richard Nixon ordered a "rapid but orderly" phase-out of herbicide operations in Vietnam.

During the 1980s, Meselson investigated allegations that "yellow rain" was a Soviet toxin weapon being used against Hmong tribespeople in Laos. Citing the physical appearance and high pollen content of samples of the alleged agent; the resemblance of the alleged attacks to showers of feces from swarms of honeybees that he and entomologist Thomas Seeley documented during a 1983 field study in Thailand; the inability of US and UK government laboratories to corroborate initial reports of the presence of trichothecene mycotoxins in samples of the alleged agent and in biomedical samples from alleged victims; the lack of any supporting evidence from extensive interviews with Vietnamese military defectors and prisoners; and other considerations, Meselson and his colleagues argued that the allegations were mistaken.

In April 1980 Meselson served as a resident consultant to the CIA investigating a major outbreak of anthrax among people in the Soviet city of Sverdlovsk. He concluded that on the basis of available evidence the official Soviet explanation that the outbreak was caused by consumption of meat from infected cattle was plausible but that there should be an independent on-site investigation. After the collapse of the Soviet Union, he was allowed to bring a team to Sverdlovsk in 1992 and again in 1993. Their reports conclusively showed that the official Soviet explanation was wrong and that the outbreak was caused by the release of an anthrax aerosol at a military biological facility in the city.

Meselson is a member of the U.S. National Academy of Sciences, the American Academy of Arts and Sciences, the American Philosophical Society, the Académie des Sciences (Paris), the Royal Society (London) and the Russian Academy of Sciences and has received numerous awards and honors in the field of science and in public affairs. He has served on the Council of the National Academy of Sciences, the Council of the Smithsonian Institution, the Arms Control and Non-Proliferation Advisory Board to the US Secretary of State and the Committee on International Security and Arms Control of the US National Academy of Sciences. He is past President of the Federation of American Scientists, and presently is co-director of the Harvard Sussex Program on Chemical and Biological Weapons and a member of the board of directors of the Belfer Center for Science and International Affairs at the John F. Kennedy School of Government at Harvard University.

== Selected awards ==
- 1963 US National Academy of Sciences Prize for Molecular Biology
- 1964 Eli Lilly Award in Microbiology or Immunology
- 1966 Guggenheim Fellowship
- 1971 Alumni Medal, University of Chicago Alumni Association
- 1972 Public Service Award, Federation of American Scientists
- 1975 Alumni Distinguished Service Award, California Institute of Technology
- 1975 Lehman Award, New York Academy of Sciences
- 1978 Leo Szilard Award, American Physical Society
- 1983 Presidential Award, New York Academy of Sciences
- 1984 MacArthur Fellows Program Fellowship
- 1990 Scientific Freedom and Responsibility Award, American Association for the Advancement of Science
- 1995 Genetics Society of America - Thomas Hunt Morgan Medal for lifetime contributions
- 2002 Public Service Award, American Society for Cell Biology
- 2004 Lasker Award for Special Achievement in Medical Science
- 2005 Life Member of the New York Academy of Sciences.
- 2008 Mendel Medal of the UK Genetics Society.
- 2019 Future of Life Award for helping ban bioweapons.

=== Honorary doctoral degrees ===
- 1966 Oakland University
- 1971 Columbia University
- 1975 University of Chicago
- 1987 Yale University
- 1988 Princeton University
- 2003 Northwestern University
- 2013 McGill University
- 2017 Rockefeller University

== Personal life ==
He married three times, first to Katherine Kaynis, then to Sarah Page, with whom he had two daughters, Amy and Zoe. His third marriage was to Jeanne Guillemin, with whom he shares two stepsons.
