= Martha Chase =

American geneticist

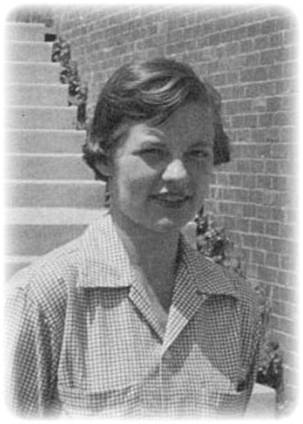
- Born: Martha Cowles Chase; November 30, 1927; Cleveland Heights, Ohio, USA
- Died: August 8, 2003 (aged 75); Lorain, Ohio, USA
- Other name: Martha C. Epstein
- Education: College of Wooster, University of Southern California
- Known for: Hershey–Chase experiment
- Scientific career
- Fields: Genetics, Biochemistry, Molecular Biology
- Workplaces: Cold Spring Harbor Laboratory, Oak Ridge National Laboratory, University of Rochester
- Doctoral advisor: Giuseppe Bertani, Margaret Lieb

Martha Cowles Chase (November 30, 1927 – August 8, 2003), also known as Martha C. Epstein, was an American geneticist who in 1952, with Alfred Hershey, experimentally confirmed that DNA rather than protein is the genetic material of life.

== Early life and college education ==
Chase was born in 1927 in Cleveland, Ohio. Her father was a Western Reserve University Science Instructor and she grew up with her family in Cleveland Heights, Ohio. After graduating from Cleveland Heights High School, she received a bachelor's degree from the College of Wooster in 1950, then worked as a research assistant before returning to school in 1959 and receiving a PhD in Microbiology from the University of Southern California in 1964.

== Research and later life ==
In 1950, Chase began working as a research assistant at Cold Spring Harbor Laboratory in the laboratory of bacteriologist and geneticist Alfred Hershey. In 1952, she and Hershey performed the Hershey–Chase experiment, which helped to confirm that genetic information is held and transmitted by DNA, not by protein. The experiment involved radioactively labeling either protein or nucleic acid of the bacteriophage T2 (a virus that infects bacteria) and seeing which component entered Escherichia coli upon infection. They found that nucleic acids but not protein were transferred, helping resolve controversy over the composition of hereditary information. Hershey won the Nobel Prize in Physiology or Medicine for the discovery in 1969, but Chase was not included.

Despite her work, Chase has not received support from scientific organizations, which some researchers attribute to gender bias, comparing her case with similar examples of male colleagues. She left Cold Spring Harbor Laboratory in 1953 and worked with Gus Doermann at Oak Ridge National Laboratory in Tennessee, and later at the University of Rochester. Throughout the 1950s, she returned yearly to Cold Spring Harbor to take part in meetings of the Phage Group of biologists. In 1959, she began doctoral studies at University of Southern California in the laboratory of Giuseppe Bertani. Bertani moved to Sweden and Chase finished her thesis with Margaret Lieb in 1964.

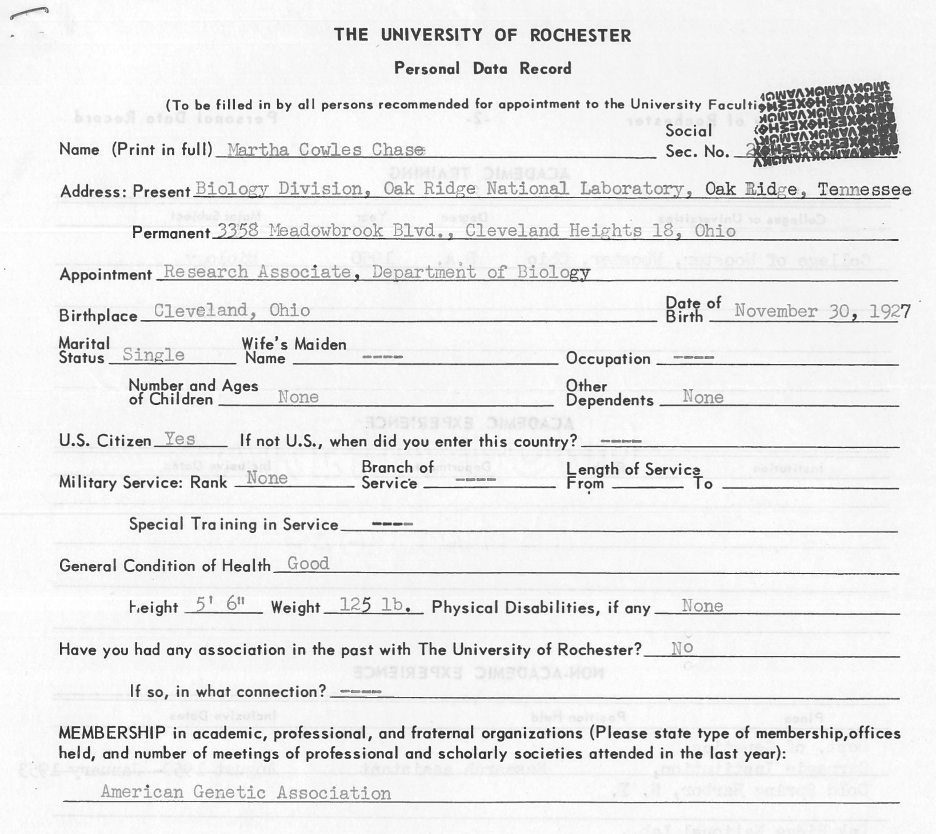
The file with personal data of Martha Chase as an employee of the University of Rochester: researchers point out that the line "wife's maiden name" illustrates the gender inequality of the time, as it implies that the research assistant will be only a man.

While in California, Chase met and married fellow scientist Richard Epstein in the late 1950s and changed her name to Martha C. Epstein. The marriage was brief and they divorced shortly after with no children. A series of setbacks through the 1960s, for example, not having a faculty position at an institution nor own laboratory, essentially ended her career in science. She moved back to Ohio to live with family and spent the last decades of her life suffering from a form of dementia that robbed her of short-term memory. She died of pneumonia on August 8, 2003, at the age of 75.

Years later, Martha Chase never received recognition as evidenced by a 2020 publication by the University of Rochester, Celebration of Women, on women in STEM fields who were affiliated with the university. In 2024, a journal paper was published, "Martha Chase at the University of Rochester: The Woman in STEM Who Was Forgotten" that addressed this oversight, as well as her contributions.

== Namesakes ==
The family Chaseviridae, a group of bacteriophages in order Caudovirales, was named in honor of Martha Chase.

== Key paper ==
- Hershey, A. D. and Martha Chase. "Independent Functions of Viral Protein and Nucleic Acid in Growth of Bacteriophage." J. Gen. Physiol., 36 (1): 39-56, September 20, 1952, at Oregon State University website
