= Salvador Luria =

Italian-American microbiologist (1912–1991)

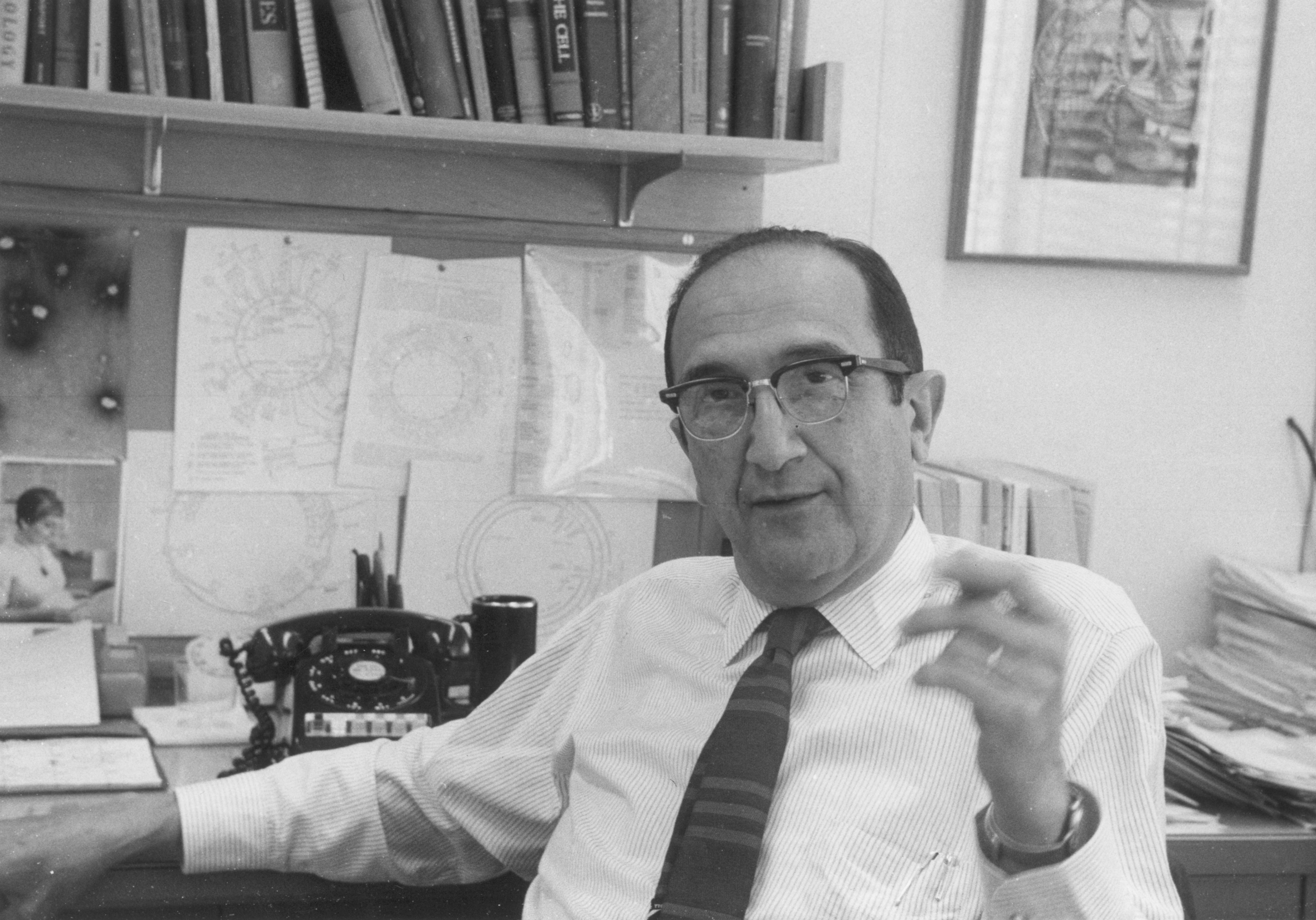
- Luria c. 1969
- Born: Salvatore Luria; August 13, 1912; Turin, Piedmont l, Kingdom of Italy
- Died: February 6, 1991 (aged 78); Lexington, Massachusetts, U.S.
- Citizenship: Italian; American (since 1950)
- Education: University of Turin
- Spouse: Zella Luria (m. 1945)
- Children: 1
- Awards: John Simon Guggenheim Memorial Fellowship (1942); Nobel Prize in Physiology or Medicine (1969); Louisa Gross Horwitz Prize (1969)
- Scientific career
- Fields: Molecular biology
- Workplaces: Columbia University; Indiana University; University of Illinois Urbana–Champaign; Massachusetts Institute of Technology
- Doctoral students: James D. Watson; Jon Kabat-Zinn

Salvador Edward Luria (/ˈlʊəriə/ LOOR-ee-ə; born Salvatore Luria, Italian: [salvaˈtoːre ˈluːrja]; August 13, 1912 – February 6, 1991) was an Italian microbiologist, later a naturalized U.S. citizen. He won the Nobel Prize in Physiology or Medicine in 1969, with Max Delbrück and Alfred Hershey, for their discoveries on the replication mechanism and the genetic structure of viruses. Salvador Luria also showed that bacterial resistance to viruses (phages) is genetically inherited.

== Biography ==
=== Early life ===
Luria was born Salvatore Luria in Turin, Italy to an influential Italian Sephardi Jewish family. His parents were Davide and Ester (Sacerdote) Luria. He attended the medical school at the University of Turin studying with Giuseppe Levi. There, he met two other future Nobel laureates: Rita Levi-Montalcini and Renato Dulbecco. He obtained his M. D. summa cum laude in 1935. From 1936 to 1937, Luria served his required time in the Italian army as a medical officer. He then took classes in radiology at the University of Rome. Here, he was introduced to Max Delbrück's theories on the gene as a molecule and began to formulate methods for testing genetic theory with the bacteriophages, viruses that infect bacteria.

In 1938, he received a fellowship to study in the United States, where he intended to work with Delbrück. Soon after Luria received the award, Benito Mussolini's fascist regime banned Jews from academic research fellowships. Without funding sources for work in the U.S. or Italy, Luria left his home country for Paris, France in 1938. As the Nazi German armies invaded France in 1940, Luria fled on bicycle to Marseille where he received an immigration visa to the United States.

=== Phage research ===
Salvador Luria with Esther Lederberg at the 1953 Cold Spring Harbor Symposium. In the background are Aaron Novick, Bruce Stocker, Haig Papazian and Geraldine Lindegren.

Luria arrived in New York City on September 12, 1940, and soon changed his first and middle names. With the help of physicist Enrico Fermi, whom he knew from his time at the University of Rome, Luria received a Rockefeller Foundation fellowship at Columbia University. He soon met Delbrück and Hershey, and they collaborated on experiments at Cold Spring Harbor Laboratory and in Delbrück's lab at Vanderbilt University.

His famous experiment with Delbrück in 1943, known as the Luria–Delbrück experiment, demonstrated statistically that inheritance in bacteria must follow Darwinian rather than Lamarckian principles and that mutant bacteria occurring randomly can still bestow viral resistance without the virus being present. The idea that natural selection affects bacteria has profound consequences, for example, it explains how bacteria develop antibiotic resistance.

Luria and Latarjet in 1947 published a quantitative analysis on the effect of ultraviolet irradiation on bacteriophage multiplication during intracellular growth. During the early course of infection they found an increase in bacteriophage resistance to ultraviolet irradiation and then later a decrease. At the time this pattern, known as the Luria-Laterjet effect, was published little was known about the central role of DNA in biology. Later work established that multiple specific DNA repair pathways, encoded by the infecting bacteriophage, contribute to the increase in UV resistance early in infection.

From 1943 to 1950, he worked at Indiana University. His first graduate student was James D. Watson, who went on to discover the structure of DNA with Francis Crick. In January 1947, Luria became a naturalized citizen of the United States.

In 1950, Luria moved to the University of Illinois Urbana–Champaign. In the early 1950s, Luria and Giuseppe Bertani discovered the phenomenon of host-controlled restriction and modification of a bacterial virus: a culture of E. coli can significantly reduce the production of phages grown in other strains; however, once the phage become established in that strain, they also become restricted in their ability to grow in other strains. It was later discovered by other researchers that bacteria produce enzymes that cut viral DNA at particular sequences but not the bacteria's own DNA, which is protected by methylation. These enzymes became known as restriction enzymes and developed into one of the main molecular tools in molecular biology.

Luria won the Nobel Prize in Physiology or Medicine in 1969, with Max Delbrück and Alfred Hershey, for their discoveries on the replication mechanism and the genetic structure of viruses.

=== Later work ===
In 1959, he became chair of Microbiology at the Massachusetts Institute of Technology (MIT). At MIT, he switched his research focus from phages to cell membranes and bacteriocins. While on sabbatical in 1963 to study at the Institut Pasteur in Paris, he found that bacteriocins impair the function of cell membranes. Returning to MIT, his lab discovered that bacteriocins achieve this impairment by forming holes in the cell membrane, allowing ions to flow through and destroy the electrochemical gradient of cells. In 1972, he became chair of The Center for Cancer Research at MIT. The department he established included future Nobel Prize winners David Baltimore, Susumu Tonegawa, Phillip Allen Sharp and H. Robert Horvitz.

In addition to the Nobel Prize, Luria received a number of awards and recognitions. He was elected to the American Academy of Arts and Sciences in 1959. He was named a member of the National Academy of Sciences in 1960. In 1964, he was elected to the American Philosophical Society. From 1968 to 1969, he served as president of the American Society for Microbiology. In 1969, he was awarded the Louisa Gross Horwitz Prize from Columbia University together with Max Delbrück, co-winner with Luria of the Nobel Prize in Physiology or Medicine in 1969. In the U.S. he won the 1974 National Book Award in Science for his popular science book Life: the Unfinished Experiment and received the National Medal of Science in 1991.

=== Political activism ===
Throughout his career, Luria was an outspoken political advocate. He joined with Linus Pauling in 1957 to protest against nuclear weapon testing. Luria was an opponent of the Vietnam War and a supporter of organized labor. In the 1970s, he was involved in debates over genetic engineering, advocating a compromise position of moderate oversight and regulation rather than the extremes of a complete ban or full scientific freedom. Due to his political involvement, he was blacklisted from receiving funding from the National Institutes of Health for a short time in 1969.

Noam Chomsky describes him as a friend, and writes that Luria attempted to influence Jewish American writer Elie Wiesel's public stance on Israel.

=== Death ===
Luria died in Lexington, Massachusetts of a heart attack on 6 February 1991 at the age of 78.

== Books ==
- 1973: Life: the Unfinished Experiment, Charles Scribner's Sons ISBN 978-0-684-13309-6
- 1974: 36 Lectures in Biology, MIT Press ISBN 0-262-12068-2
- 1984: A Slot Machine, A Broken Test Tube: An Autobiography, New York: Harper and Row ISBN 0-06-337036-0

== See also ==
- List of Jewish Nobel laureates
- Phage group
- Luria–Delbrück experiment
