= Emory Ellis =

American biochemist (1906–2003)

- Born: October 29, 1906; Grayville, Illinois
- Died: October 26, 2003 (aged 96)
- Education: California Institute of Technology

Emory Leon Ellis (29 October 1906 – 26 October 2003) was an American biochemist. He worked with Max Delbrück on the paper The Growth of Bacteriophage.

== Biography ==
Ellis was born on 29 October 1906 in Grayville, Illinois. He attended California Institute of Technology from 1925, attaining his PhD in 1934 in biochemistry. Apart from one year working for the Food and Drug Administration, Ellis remained at Caltech until World War II. Ellis' interests were in bacteriophage which he believed would contribute to understanding the role of viruses in cancer. He started work on their role in animals, but found that there were extra problems and expense related to maintaining the animals and so switched to phage. Ellis published the important paper The Growth of Bacteriophage with Max Delbrück in 1939. He gave up work on phage after this paper and returned to cancer research before moving to Naval Air Weapons Station China Lake from 1943, working with rocket-program employees as the onsite representative of Caltech. Ellis became Executive Director of the Office of Industrial Associates in Caltech for two years between 1963 and 1965 and retired in 1969. Ellis died on 26 October 2003.

In a retrospective article, Ellis described his interactions with Delbruck. The quantitative methods for studying bacteriophage that Delbruck initially learned from Ellis, were further developed by a group of scientists informally known as the "phage group" (see phage group). Under the leadership of Delbruck this group played a central role in the early development of molecular biology.

== See also ==
- Phage group
