= Meselson–Stahl experiment =

1958 experiment in DNA replicatication

The Meselson–Stahl experiment is an experiment by Matthew Meselson and Franklin Stahl in 1958 which supported Watson and Crick's hypothesis that DNA replication was semiconservative. In semiconservative replication, when the double-stranded DNA helix is replicated, each of the two new double-stranded DNA helices consisted of one strand from the original helix and one newly synthesized. It has been called "the most beautiful experiment in biology". Meselson and Stahl decided the best way to trace the parent DNA would be to tag them by changing one of its atoms. Since nitrogen is present in all of the DNA bases, they generated parent DNA containing a heavier isotope of nitrogen than would be present naturally. This altered mass allowed them to determine how much of the parent DNA was present in the DNA after successive cycles of replication.

== Hypothesis ==
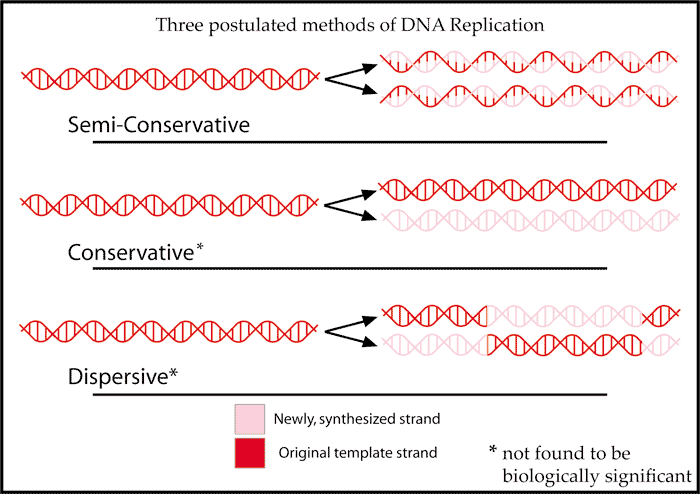
A summary of the three postulated methods of DNA synthesis

Three hypotheses had been previously proposed for the method of replication of DNA.

In the semiconservative hypothesis, proposed by Watson and Crick, the two strands of a DNA molecule separate during replication. Each strand then acts as a template for synthesis of a new strand.

The conservative hypothesis proposed that the entire DNA molecule acted as a template for the synthesis of an entirely new one. According to this model, histone proteins bind to the DNA, revolving the strand and exposing the nucleotide bases (which normally line the interior) for hydrogen bonding.

The dispersive hypothesis is exemplified by a model proposed by Max Delbrück, which attempts to solve the problem of unwinding the two strands of the double helix by a mechanism that breaks the DNA backbone every 10 nucleotides or so, untwists the molecule, and attaches the old strand to the end of the newly synthesized one. This would synthesize the DNA in short pieces alternating from one strand to the other.

Each of these three models makes a different prediction about the distribution of the "old" DNA in molecules formed after replication. In the conservative hypothesis, after replication, one molecule is the entirely conserved "old" molecule, and the other is all newly synthesized DNA. The semiconservative hypothesis predicts that each molecule after replication will contain one old and one new strand. The dispersive model predicts that each strand of each new molecule will contain a mixture of old and new DNA.

== Experimental procedure and results ==

Nitrogen is a major constituent of DNA. ^{14}N is by far the most abundant isotope of nitrogen, but DNA with the heavier (but non-radioactive) ^{15}N isotope is also functional.

E. coli was grown for several generations in a medium containing NH_{4}Cl with ^{15}N. When DNA is extracted from these cells and made to undergo buoyant density centrifugation on a salt (CsCl) density gradient, the DNA separates out at the point at which its density equals that of the salt solution. The DNA of the cells grown in ^{15}N medium had a higher density than cells grown in normal ^{14}N medium. After that, E. coli cells with only ^{15}N in their DNA were transferred to a ^{14}N medium and were allowed to divide; the progress of cell division was monitored by microscopic cell counts and by colony assay.

DNA was extracted periodically and was compared to pure ^{14}N DNA and ^{15}N DNA. After one replication, the DNA was found to have intermediate density. Since conservative replication would result in equal amounts of DNA of the higher and lower densities (but no DNA of an intermediate density), conservative replication was excluded. However, this result was consistent with both semiconservative and dispersive replication. Semiconservative replication would result in double-stranded DNA with one strand of ^{15}N DNA, and one of ^{14}N DNA, while dispersive replication would result in double-stranded DNA with both strands having mixtures of ^{15}N and ^{14}N DNA, either of which would have appeared as DNA of an intermediate density.

The authors continued to sample cells as replication continued. DNA from cells after two replications had been completed was found to consist of equal amounts of DNA with two different densities, one corresponding to the intermediate density of DNA of cells grown for only one division in ^{14}N medium, the other corresponding to DNA from cells grown exclusively in ^{14}N medium. This was inconsistent with dispersive replication, which would have resulted in a single density, lower than the intermediate density of the one-generation cells, but still higher than cells grown only in ^{14}N DNA medium, as the original ^{15}N DNA would have been split evenly among all DNA strands. The result was consistent with the semiconservative replication hypothesis.
