= Ernst Peter Fischer =

German historian of science and science publicist

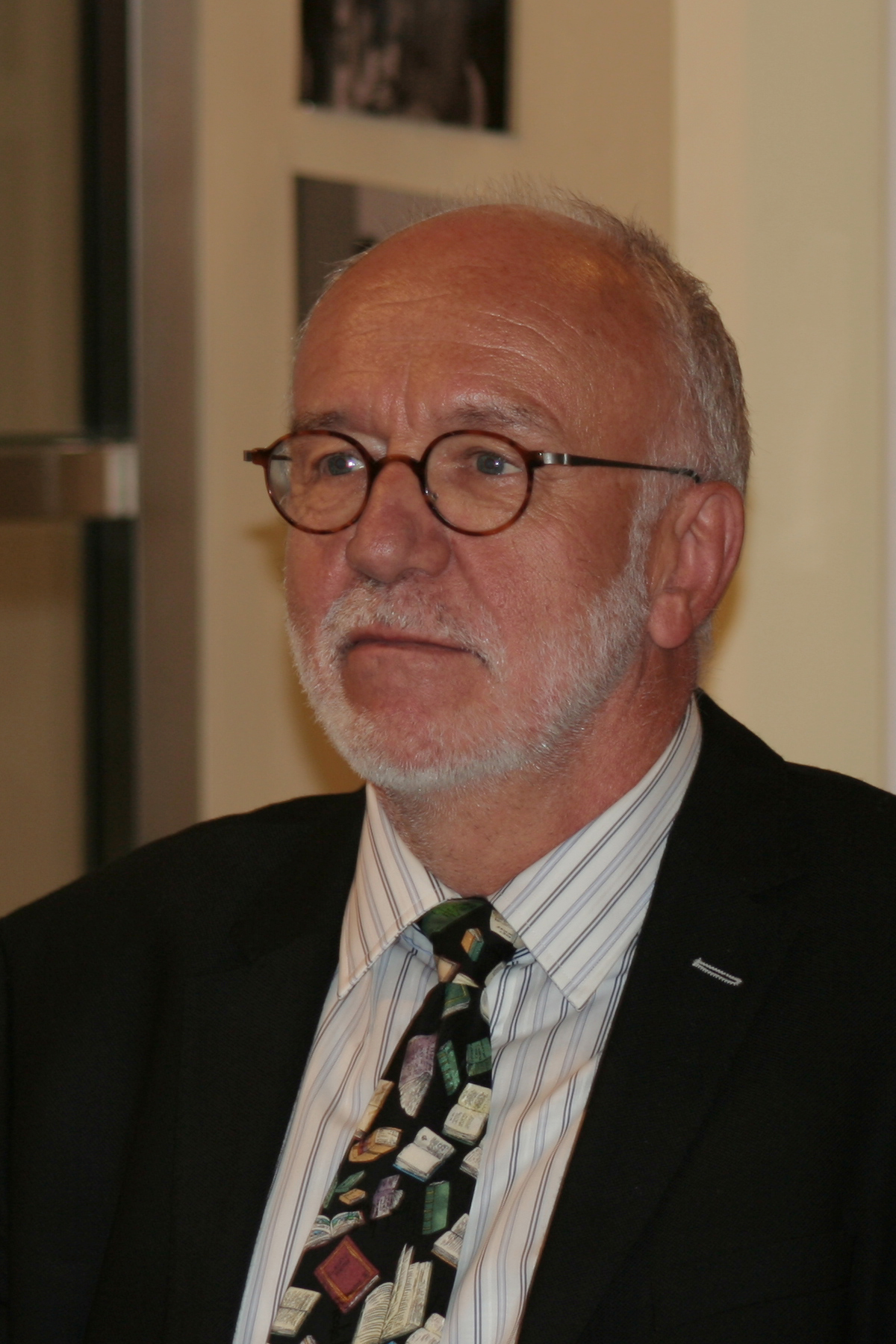
- Fischer in 2009
- Born: 18 January 1947 (age 79); Wuppertal
- Occupations: Historian of science and science publicist

Ernst Peter Fischer (born 18 January 1947) is a German Historian of Science and Publicist.

== Life and work ==
Ernst Peter Fischer studied mathematics, physics, and biology and graduated from the California Institute of Technology in 1977. In 1987, he qualified as a university lecturer in the history of science, and taught as a professor at the University of Konstanz. Between 1989 and 1999 he was the publisher of the Mannheimer Forum. This position was previously held by Hoimar von Ditfurth.

During his free time, Fischer engaged in scientific journalism, as well as spending time as a mentor. He worked as a publisher for the Stiftung Forum für Verantwortung.

As a science publisher, Fisher wrote articles for several newspapers. Among them were GEO, Bild der Wissenschaft, Die Weltwoche and the Frankfurter Allgemeine Zeitung.

== Awards ==
Fischer's published work has received multiple awards.

- 1980: Heinrich-Bechold-Medaille
- 1981: Preis der wissenschaftlichen Gesellschaft Freiburg
- 2002: Lorenz-Oken-Medaille
- 2003: Treviranus-Medaille
- 2003: Eduard-Rhein-Kulturpreis
- 2004: Medaille für Naturwissenschaftliche Publizistik der Deutschen Physikalischen Gesellschaft
- 2004: Sartorius-Preis der Akademie der Wissenschaften zu Göttingen
- 2011: Honorary member of the Naturforschende Gesellschaft zu Emden

== Published works ==
- Warum Spinat nur Popeye stark macht. Mythen und Legenden in der modernen Wissenschaft. Pantheon Verlag, München 2011, ISBN 978-3-570-55123-3.
- Information - eine kurze Geschichte in 5 Kapiteln. Verlagshaus Jacoby & Stuart 2010, ISBN 978-3-941787-15-5.
- Die Hintertreppe zum Quantensprung. Die Erforschung der kleinsten Teilchen der Natur von Max Planck bis Anton Zeilinger. Herbig Verlag, München 2010, ISBN 978-3-7766-2643-8.
- Laser - Eine deutsche Erfolgsgeschichte von Einstein bis heute. Siedler-Verlag, München 2010, ISBN 978-3-88680-946-2.
- Die Charité: Ein Krankenhaus in Berlin - 1710 bis heute. Siedler-Verlag, München 2009, ISBN 978-3-88680-880-9.
- Die kosmische Hintertreppe: Die Erforschung des Himmels von Aristoteles bis Stephen Hawking. Nymphenburger Verlag, München 2009, ISBN 978-3-485-01186-0.
- Der kleine Darwin. Alles, was man über Evolution wissen sollte. Pantheon Verlag, München 2009, ISBN 978-3-570-55087-8.
- Das große Buch der Evolution. Fackelträger Verlag, Köln 2008, ISBN 978-3-7716-4373-7.
- Einfach klug: 60 Ratschläge für ein gelingendes Leben. Nymphenburger Verlag, München 2009, ISBN 978-3-485-01118-1.
- Irren ist bequem: Wissenschaft quer gedacht. Kosmos Verlag, Stuttgart 2007, ISBN 978-3-440-11098-0.
- Der Physiker: Max Planck und das Zerfallen der Welt. Siedler Verlag, München 2007, ISBN 978-3-570-55116-5.
- Max Planck - ein Porträt. Eine Vorlesung (auf DVD) von Ernst Peter Fischer über die Physik, das tragische Leben, sowie Religiosität und Philosophie von Max Planck. Rezension - Komplett Media GmbH, 2007, DVD: ISBN 978-3-8312-9522-7 CD: ISBN 978-3-8312-6225-0.
- Die Nachtseite der Wissenschaft. Vorlesung aus der Reihe "uni-auditorium", Audio CD, Komplett Media, Juni 2007, ISBN 978-3-8312-6194-9.
- Schrödingers Katze auf dem Mandelbrotbaum: Durch die Hintertür zur Wissenschaft. Pantheon Verlag, München 2006, ISBN 978-3-442-15510-1.
- Brücken zum Kosmos: Wolfgang Pauli zwischen Kernphysik und Weltharmonie. Libelle Verlag, Lengwil (CH) 2005, ISBN 978-3-909081-44-8.
- Einstein trifft Picasso und geht mit ihm ins Kino oder: Die Erfindung der Moderne. Piper Verlag, München 2005, ISBN 978-3-492-04682-4.
- Einstein für die Westentasche. Piper Verlag, München 2005, ISBN 978-3-492-04685-5.
- Was Professor Kuckuck noch nicht wusste. (mit Henning Genz) Rowohlt Verlag, Reinbek 2004, ISBN 978-3-499-61580-1.
- Die Bildung des Menschen: Was die Naturwissenschaften über uns wissen. Ullstein Verlag, Berlin 2004, ISBN 978-3-550-07606-0.
- Stille Kräfte, große Fülle: Die Geschichte der Südchemie AG. Piper Verlag, München 2004, ISBN 978-3-492-04582-7.
- Einstein, Hawking, Singh & Co.: Bücher, die man kennen muß. Piper Verlag, München 2004, ISBN 978-3-492-04551-3.
- Geschichte des Gens. James D. Watson und die neue Wissenschaft vom Leben. Fischer Verlag, Frankfurt am Main 2003, ISBN 978-3-596-15363-3.
- Am Anfang war die Doppelhelix: James D. Watson und die neue Wissenschaft vom Leben. Ullstein Verlag, Berlin 2003, ISBN 978-3-550-07566-7.
- Das Genom. Fischer Verlag, Frankfurt am Main 2002, ISBN 978-3-596-15362-6.
- Das genetische Abenteuer. My favourite book, Düsseldorf 2001, ISBN 978-3-936143-19-5.
- Images & Imagination. Editiones Roche, Basel 2001, ISBN 978-3-907770-86-3.
- Werner Heisenberg: Das selbstvergessene Genie. Piper Verlag, München 2001, ISBN 978-3-492-03855-3.
- Die andere Bildung. Was man von den Naturwissenschaften wissen sollte. Ullstein Verlag, Berlin 2001, ISBN 978-3-550-07151-5.
- An den Grenzen des Denkens: Wolfgang Pauli - Ein Nobelpreisträger über die Nachtseiten der Wissenschaft. Herder Verlag, Freiburg 2000, ISBN 978-3-451-04842-5.
- Leonardo, Heisenberg & Co.: Eine kleine Geschichte der Wissenschaft in Porträts. Piper Verlag, München 2000, ISBN 978-3-492-03942-0.
- Aristoteles, Einstein & Co.: Eine kleine Geschichte der Wissenschaft in Porträts. Piper Verlag, München 1995, ISBN 978-3-492-04817-0.
- Ernst Peter Fischer and Carol Lipson: Thinking About Science. Max Delbrück and the Origins of Molecular Biology. Rezension W.W. Norton & Company, New York 1988, ISBN 978-0-393-02508-8
