= Charles M. Steinberg =

Immunologist

- Born: 1932
- Died: 17 September 1999 (aged about 67)
- Education: Vanderbilt University, California Institute of Technology
- Known for: Discovery of the amber-mutant of T4 bacteriophage
- Scientific career
- Fields: Immunobiology
- Workplaces: California Institute of Technology, Basel Institute for Immunology
- Doctoral advisor: Max Delbrück

Charles M. “Charley” Steinberg (1932 – 17 September 1999) was an American geneticist and immunobiologist known for his work in bacteriophage genetics and for helping bring molecular-genetic approaches into immunology. A student of Max Delbrück at the California Institute of Technology, Steinberg was part of the phage group tradition that shaped early molecular biology. He was a co-discoverer of amber mutants of bacteriophage T4, conditional-lethal mutants that became important tools for studying essential genes, viral morphogenesis, DNA replication, DNA repair, genetic recombination and the relationship between nonsense mutations and stop codons.

Steinberg was also remembered by colleagues as an unusually quick, playful and wide-ranging intellect. Richard Feynman, who briefly studied molecular biology at Caltech and collaborated with Steinberg and others on bacteriophage T4, reportedly called Steinberg “the smartest guy I know”.

== Early life and education ==
Steinberg was born and raised in Alabama. He graduated from Vanderbilt University before entering the California Institute of Technology, where he worked in Max Delbrück’s group on bacteriophage genetics. He received his Ph.D. from Caltech in 1961.

According to a memorial account by Louis Du Pasquier, Delbrück was preparing to leave for the Institute of Genetics in Cologne with several co-workers, including Steinberg, and pushed Steinberg to complete his degree before departing for Germany. Steinberg subsequently worked in Cologne and later at Oak Ridge National Laboratory before moving to Switzerland.

== Bacteriophage genetics ==
Steinberg’s early scientific work focused on the genetics of bacteriophage T4, then one of the central model systems of molecular biology. In 1962 he was a co-author, with Robert S. Edgar, Richard Feynman, S. Klein and I. Lielausis, of “Mapping Experiments with r Mutants of Bacteriophage T4D”.

The paper reflected the interdisciplinary character of Caltech’s phage work, in which physicists, geneticists and molecular biologists worked together on problems of heredity, mutation and viral development. Feynman later recalled one practical technique from the course: “They taught us how to hold a test tube and take its cap off with one hand”, adding that he still used the same dexterity when opening and closing a toothpaste tube.

Steinberg’s best-known early contribution was his work with Richard H. Epstein and Antoinette Bolle on amber mutants of bacteriophage T4D. Amber mutants are conditional-lethal mutants: they fail to grow under some conditions but can grow in bacterial hosts carrying appropriate suppressor mutations. This made them especially useful for studying essential genes that could not otherwise be analyzed easily because loss-of-function mutations would be lethal.

In the belatedly published paper “Amber Mutants of Bacteriophage T4D: Their Isolation and Genetic Characterization”, Epstein, Bolle and Steinberg reported the isolation of numerous T4D mutants that could not form plaques on strain B of ‘’Escherichia coli’’ but could grow nearly normally on other strains, particularly CR63. The authors concluded that amber mutants represented a subclass of base-substitution mutations and that such mutations occurred in many genes distributed across the T4 genome.

The amber mutants opened much of the T4 genome to experimental analysis. Franklin W. Stahl later wrote that conditional-lethal mutants made it possible to identify most of the essential genes of T4 and helped launch studies of the molecular basis of phage development. Subsequent work with T4 amber mutants, carried out in the context of the Phage group tradition of bacteriophage genetics, contributed to understanding the circularity of the T4 linkage map, clustering of genes by function, programs of viral development, chain-terminating codons, colinearity of gene and protein product, self-assembly of organelles, DNA replication, genetic recombination, and translational control.

== Basel Institute for Immunology ==
After working in Cologne and at Oak Ridge National Laboratory, Steinberg met Niels Kaj Jerne, who later became director of the Basel Institute for Immunology. Jerne recruited Steinberg as one of the early members of the institute, which opened in October 1970. Steinberg remained at the Basel Institute for Immunology for nearly three decades, becoming a permanent member.

At Basel, Steinberg helped bring the methods and habits of microbial genetics into immunology. His work centered on the genetic basis of antibody diversity, a major problem in twentieth-century immunology. Du Pasquier wrote that Steinberg was influential in the early phases of work on the origin of antibody diversity, including collaboration with Susumu Tonegawa on the reiteration frequency of immunoglobulin light-chain genes and work that provided evidence for somatic generation of antibody diversity.

Tonegawa, who received the 1987 Nobel Prize in Physiology or Medicine for discovering the genetic principle for the generation of antibody diversity, later recalled Steinberg and Ita Askonas as helpful figures when he entered immunology and began applying molecular-biology methods to the antibody-diversity problem.

Steinberg later worked closely with Matthias Wabl and colleagues on somatic hypermutation. He was also sought out at the Basel Institute when problems required the combination of statistics, computer programming, genetics and immunology.

== Personality and mentorship ==
Steinberg was widely known as “Charley” among colleagues. Memorial accounts describe him as a mentor and intellectual presence whose influence was often exercised informally rather than through a conventional laboratory hierarchy. Du Pasquier described him as a “gray eminence” of the Basel Institute, noting that he had no laboratory or fixed research group but often worked from a chair in the cafeteria, where he listened, criticized and advised.

Jerne reportedly said of Steinberg that “in a discussion, he has the third idea”, a phrase used to describe Steinberg’s capacity to see beyond the immediate terms of a scientific argument. Colleagues also remembered his skill with language, his interest in etymology, word games and code breaking, and his reputation as an incisive editor of scientific writing. Du Pasquier described Steinberg as playful and enthusiastic outside formal scientific discussion, but also uncompromising toward superficiality, bureaucracy and weak reasoning.

The Feynman connection became part of Steinberg’s reputation. Feynman had briefly entered molecular biology at Caltech and co-authored a T4 mapping paper with Steinberg, Edgar and others. Later accounts state that Steinberg taught Feynman biology and that the two were friends. The frequently repeated report that Feynman called Steinberg “the smartest guy I know” reflected Steinberg’s standing among colleagues as an unusually sharp, witty and original scientist.

== Family ==
Steinberg had children, including Adam Steinberg. Adam Steinberg later became associated with Elgato, a computer-peripheral and digital-media company known for products such as EyeTV and Game Capture. Public company materials identify Adam Steinberg as a senior Elgato executive, including as vice president of marketing.

== Legacy ==
Steinberg’s career linked two major fields of twentieth-century biology: classical bacteriophage genetics and modern molecular immunology. His work on T4 amber mutants helped make essential genes experimentally accessible and contributed to the genetic dissection of viral development. At Basel, he helped shape an approach to immunology that treated antibody diversity as a genetic and molecular problem. Among colleagues, he was remembered not only for his published work but for the force of his mind: playful, witty, rigorous and memorable.

== See also ==
- The Phage Group
- Frank Stahl
- Suppressor mutation
