= Immigrant Justice Corps =

The Immigrant Justice Corps is a New York City-based fellowship program that provides free legal counsel to low-income immigrant communities. It was conceived of by Chief Judge Robert Katzmann. Amy Meselson was a recent managing attorney for the organization.
