= Max Delbrück =

German–American biophysicist (1906–1981)

Max Delbrück ForMemRS
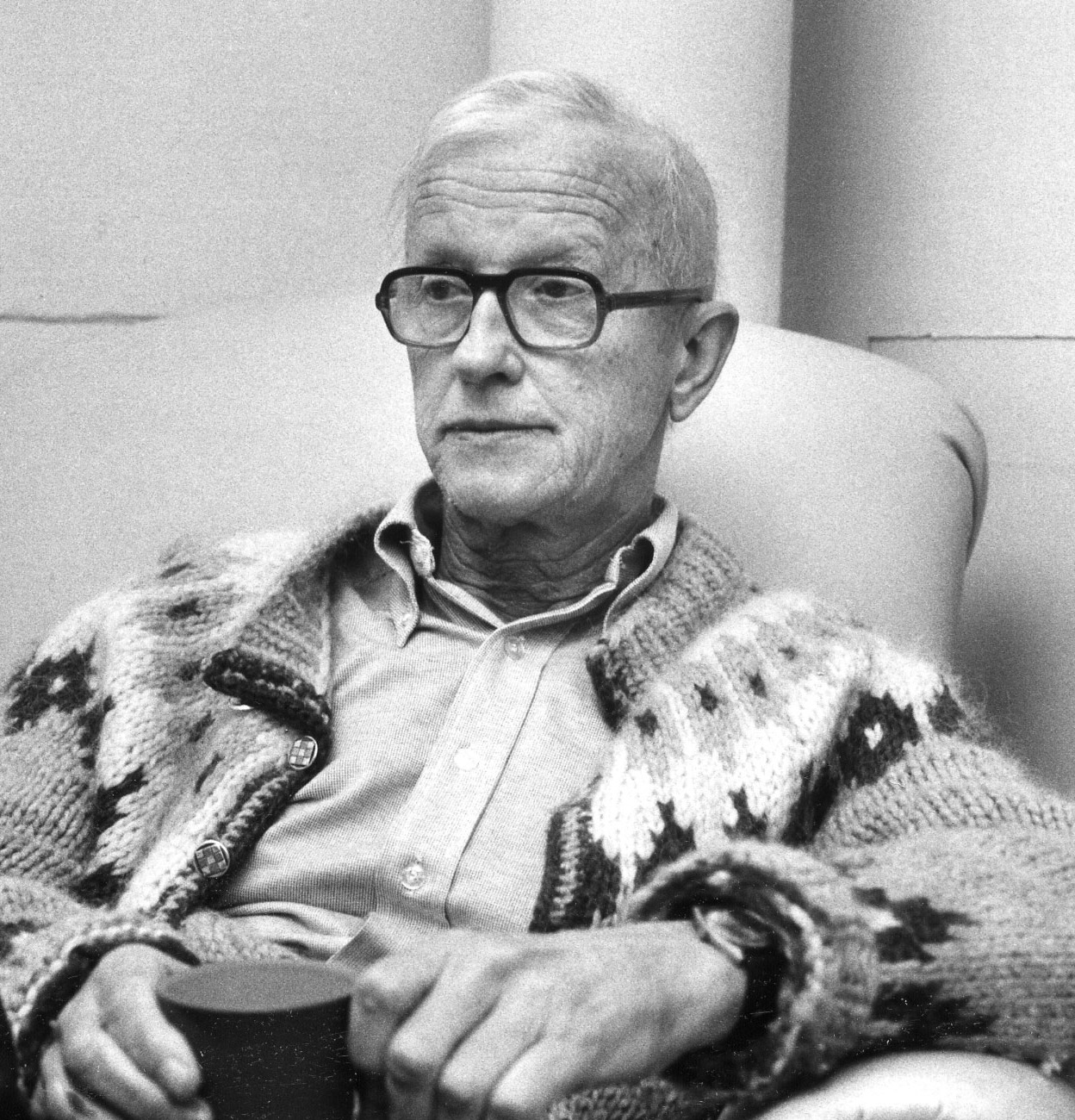
- Born: Max Ludwig Henning Delbrück; September 4, 1906; Berlin, German Empire
- Died: March 9, 1981 (aged 74); Pasadena, California, U.S.
- Citizenship: United States
- Education: University of Göttingen
- Known for: "discoveries concerning the replication mechanism and the genetic structure of viruses" (Nobel Committee); Delbrück scattering; Luria–Delbrück experiment; Saffman–Delbrück model
- Spouse: Mary Bruce
- Children: 4
- Father: Hans Delbrück
- Relatives: Emmi Bonhoeffer (sister)
- Awards: Mendel Medal (1968); Louisa Gross Horwitz Prize (1969); Nobel Prize in Physiology or Medicine (1969)
- Scientific career
- Fields: Biophysics
- Workplaces: Kaiser Wilhelm Institute for Chemistry; Vanderbilt University; Caltech
- Doctoral advisor: Lise Meitner
- Doctoral students: Lily Jan, Yuh Nung Jan, Ernst Peter Fischer, Charles M. Steinberg

Max Ludwig Henning Delbrück (German: [maks ˈdɛl.bʁʏk]; September 4, 1906 – March 9, 1981) was a German–American biophysicist who participated in launching the molecular biology research program in the late 1930s. He stimulated physical scientists' interest into biology, especially as to basic research to physically explain genes, mysterious at the time. Formed in 1945 and led by Delbrück along with Salvador Luria and Alfred Hershey, the Phage Group made substantial headway unraveling important aspects of genetics. The three shared the 1969 Nobel Prize in Physiology or Medicine "for their discoveries concerning the replication mechanism and the genetic structure of viruses". He was the first physicist to predict what is now called Delbrück scattering.

== Early and personal life ==
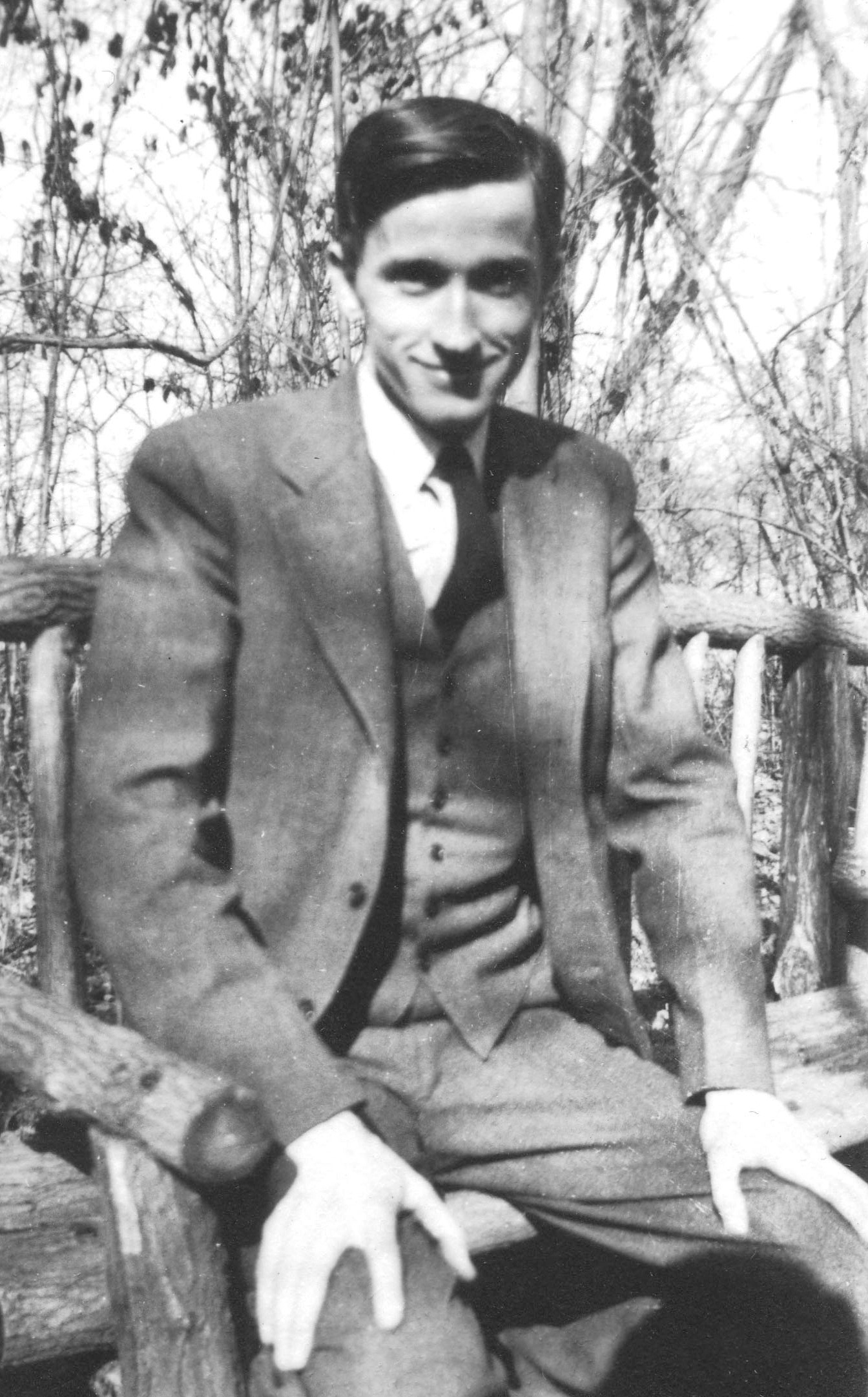
Delbrück in the early 1940s

Delbrück was born in Berlin, German Empire. His mother was granddaughter of Justus von Liebig, an eminent chemist, while his father Hans Delbrück was a history professor at the University of Berlin. In 1937, Delbrück left Nazi Germany for America—first California, then Tennessee—becoming a US citizen in 1945. In 1941, he married Mary Bruce. They had four children.

Delbrück's brother Justus, a lawyer, as well as his sister Emmi Bonhoeffer were active along with his brothers-in-law Klaus Bonhoeffer and Dietrich Bonhoeffer in resistance to Nazism. Found guilty by the People's Court for roles in the July 20, 1944 plot to assassinate Hitler, Dietrich and Klaus were executed in 1945 by the RSHA. Justus died in Soviet custody that same year. His son, Tobias Delbruck is a professor at the Institute of Neuroinformatics at the University of Zurich and ETH Zurich. Professor Tobias Delbruck is also one of the pioneers in the domain of event cameras, now increasingly being deployed in dynamic vision systems.

== Education ==
Delbrück studied astrophysics, shifting towards theoretical physics, at the University of Göttingen. After completing his Ph.D. there in 1930, he traveled through England, Denmark, and Switzerland. He met Wolfgang Pauli and Niels Bohr, who interested him in biology.

== Career and research ==
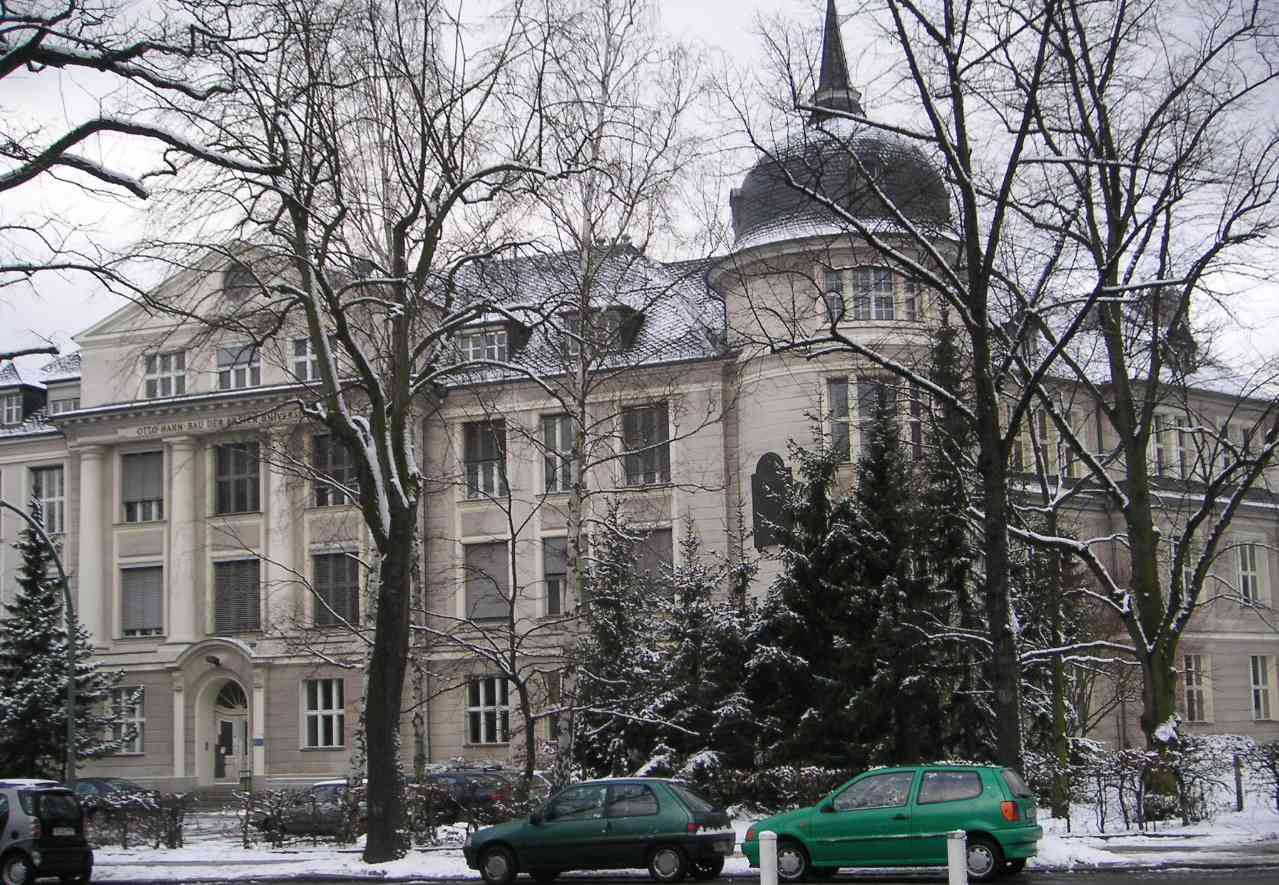
Delbrück's workplace in Berlin: Kaiser Wilhelm Institute for Chemistry, now the Free University of Berlin.

Delbrück returned to Berlin in 1932 as an assistant to Lise Meitner, who was collaborating with Otto Hahn on irradiation of uranium with neutrons. Delbrück wrote a few papers, including one in 1933 on gamma rays' scattering by a Coulomb field's polarization of a vacuum. Though theoretically tenable, his conclusion was inapplicable to the case in point, whereas Hans Bethe some 20 years later confirmed the phenomenon and named it "Delbrück scattering".

In 1935 Delbrück published a collaboration with Nikolay Timofeev-Ressovsky and Karl Zimmer, the major work Über die Natur der Genmutation und der Genstruktur. It was considered to be a major advance in understanding the nature of gene mutation and gene structure. The work was a keystone in the formation of molecular genetics. It was also an inspirational starting point for Erwin Schrödinger's thinking, a course of lectures in 1943, and the eventual writing of the book What Is Life? The Physical Aspect of the Living Cell.

In 1937, he attained a fellowship from Rockefeller Foundation—which was launching the molecular biology research program—to research genetics of the fruit fly, Drosophila melanogaster, in California Institute of Technology's biology department, where Delbrück could blend interests in biochemistry and genetics. While at Caltech, Delbrück researched bacteria and their viruses (bacteriophages or phages). In 1939, with Emory L. Ellis, he coauthored "The growth of bacteriophage", a paper reporting that the viruses reproduce in one step, not exponentially as do cellular organisms.

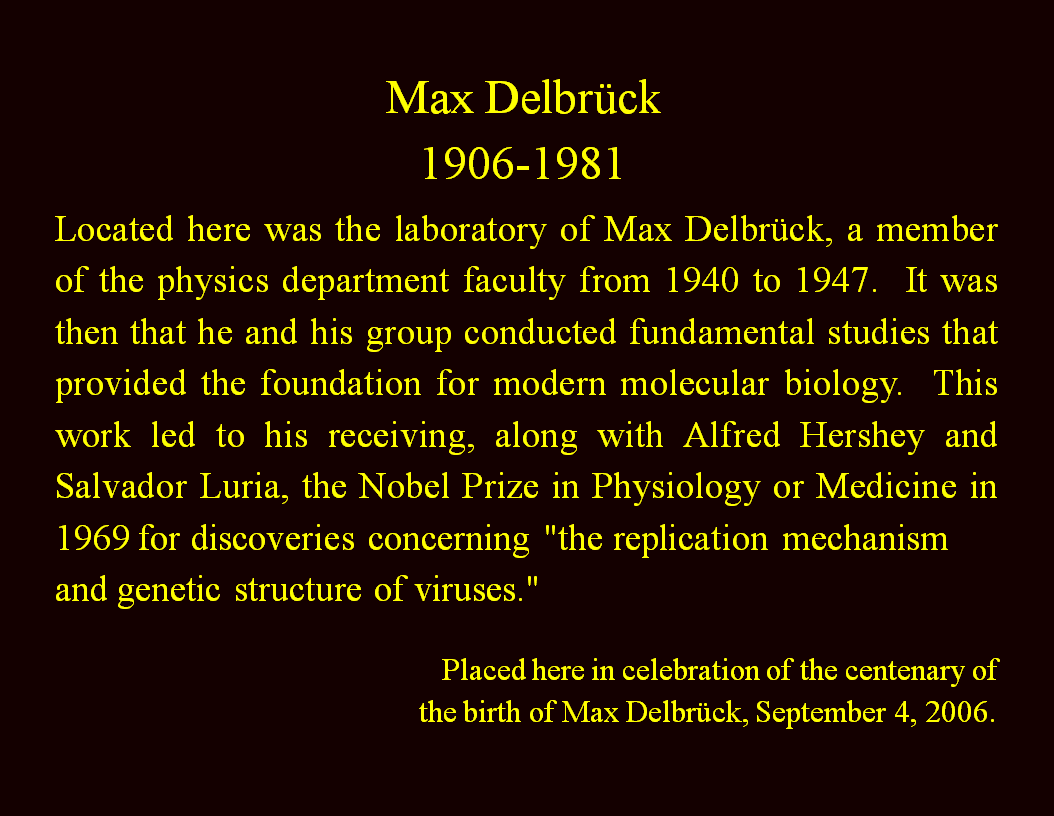
Drawing of a plaque in Buttrick Hall, Vanderbilt University commemorating the work of Max Delbrück.

Although Delbrück's Rockefeller Foundation fellowship expired in 1939, the Foundation matched him up with Vanderbilt University in Nashville, Tennessee, where from 1940 to 1947 he taught physics, yet had his laboratory in the biology department. In 1941, Delbrück met Salvador Luria of Indiana University who began visiting Vanderbilt. In 1942, Delbrück and Luria published on bacterial resistance to virus infection mediated by random mutation. Alfred Hershey of Washington University in St. Louis began visiting in 1943. The Luria–Delbrück experiment, also called the Fluctuation Test, demonstrated that Darwin's theory of natural selection acting on random mutations applies to bacteria as well as to more complex organisms. The 1969 Nobel Prize in Physiology or Medicine was awarded to both scientists in part for this work. To put this work in its historical perspective, Lamarck in 1801 first presented his theory of Inheritance of Acquired Characteristics, which stated that if an organism changes during life in order to adapt to its environment (for example stretches its neck to reach for tall trees), those changes are passed on to its offspring. He also said that evolution happens according to a predetermined plan. Darwin published his theory of evolution in his 1859 book On the Origin of Species with compelling evidence contradicting Lamarck. Darwin said that evolution is not predetermined but that there are inherent variations in all organisms, and that those variations that confer increased fitness are selected by the environment and passed on to the offspring. In the feud between Lamarck and Darwin, Darwin talked of pre-existing changes, but the nature of these changes was not known and had to await the science of genetics by Gregor Mendel's experiments on pea plants published in 1866. Support for Darwin's theory was provided when Thomas Hunt Morgan discovered that a mutated white-eyed fruit fly among red-eyed flies was able to reproduce true white-eyed offspring. The most elegant and convincing support for Darwin's ideas, however, was provided by the Luria-Delbruck experiment, which showed that mutations conferring resistance of the bacterium E. coli to T1 bacteriophage (virus) existed in the population prior to exposure to T1 and were not induced by adding T1. In other words, mutations are random events that occur whether or not they prove to be useful, while selection (for T1 resistance upon challenge with T1 in this case) provides the direction in evolution by retaining those mutations that are advantageous, discarding those that are harmful (T1 sensitivity in this case). This experiment dealt a blow to Lamarckian inheritance and set the stage for tremendous advances in genetics and molecular biology, launching a tsunami of research that eventually led to the discovery of DNA as the hereditary material and to cracking the genetic code. Of course, by then Avery, along with McCloud (and earlier, McCarty) was well on the way to showing the genetic capability of DNA.

In 1945, Delbrück, Luria, and Hershey set up a course in bacteriophage genetics at Cold Spring Harbor Laboratory on Long Island, New York. This Phage Group spurred molecular biology's early development. Delbrück received the 1969 Nobel Prize in Physiology or Medicine, shared with Luria and Hershey "for their discoveries concerning the replication mechanism and the genetic structure of viruses". The committee also noted that "The honour in the first place goes to Delbrück who transformed bacteriophage research from vague empiricism to an exact science. He analyzed and defined the conditions for precise measurement of the biological effects. Together with Luria he elaborated the quantitative methods and established the statistical criteria for evaluation which made the subsequent penetrating studies possible. Delbrück's and Luria's forte is perhaps mainly theoretical analysis, whereas Hershey above all is an eminently skillful experimenter. The three of them supplement each other well also in these respects." That year, Delbrück and Luria were also awarded by Columbia University the Louisa Gross Horwitz Prize. In late 1947, as Vanderbilt lacked the resources to keep him, Delbrück had returned to Caltech as a professor of biology, and remained there for the rest of his career. Meanwhile, he set up University of Cologne's institute for molecular genetics.

== Awards and honours ==
In addition to the Nobel Prize, Delbrück was elected a Foreign Member of the Royal Society (ForMemRS) in 1967. He was elected an EMBO Member in 1970. The Max Delbruck Prize, formerly known as the biological physics prize, is awarded by the American Physical Society and named in his honour. The Max Delbrück Center, in Berlin, Germany, national research center for molecular medicine of the Helmholtz Association also bears his name.

== Later life and legacy ==
Delbrück helped spur physical scientists' interest in biology. His inferences on genes' susceptibility to mutation was relied on by physicist Erwin Schrödinger in his 1944 book What Is Life?, which conjectured genes were an "aperiodic crystal" storing codescript and influenced crystallographer Rosalind Franklin and biologists Francis Crick and James D. Watson in their 1953 identification of cellular DNA's molecular structure as a double helix. In 1977, he retired from Caltech, remaining a Professor of Biology emeritus. He became interested in the behavioral sciences and spent some unfruitful effort on mold behavior in the 1960s.

Max Delbrück died, at age 74, on the evening of Monday, March 9, 1981, at Huntington Memorial Hospital in Pasadena, California. On August 26 to 27, 2006—the year Delbrück would have turned 100—family and friends gathered at Cold Spring Harbor Laboratory to reminisce on his life and work. Although Delbrück held some anti-reductionist views; he conjectured that ultimately a paradox—akin perhaps to the waveparticle duality of physics—would be revealed about life. His view however, was later refuted upon the discovery of the double helix structure of DNA.
