= Semiconservative replication =

Mechanism of DNA replication

Semiconservative replication is the process by which DNA is replicated in all living cells. DNA replication involves separation (unwinding) of the two strands of the double helix by helicase, with each strand acting as a template for a new complementary strand, synthesized in opposite (antiparallel) directions. The process is called semiconservative because the replicated DNA molecule contains one parental strand and one newly synthesized strand . Barring any replication errors, the copies are usually identical to their parental DNA molecules. The DNA structure was deciphered by Rosalind Franklin in 1953, which suggested that each strand of the double helix would serve as a template for synthesis of a new strand. However, it was not known how newly synthesized strands and the parental strands were combined to form the double helical DNA molecules.

== Discovery ==
Meselson-Stahl experiment using isotopes to discover semiconservative replication.

Multiple experiments were conducted to determine how DNA replicates. The semiconservative model was proposed first by Nikolai Koltsov and later confirmed by the Meselson–Stahl experiment. Since Nitrogen component of the DNA structure, the experiment involved labeling Escherichia coli DNA with two nitrogen isotopes: nitrogen-15 (^{15}N, heavy) and nitrogen-14 (^{14}N, light). E.coli grown in ^{15}N medium were transferred to the ^{14}N medium, introducing the heavy (^{15}N) DNA to the light (^{14}N) isotope. After the first round of replication, the DNA contained a heavy and a light (^{15}N-^{14}N hybrid) strand. Post the second round of replication, both hybrid and fully light (^{14}N) DNA were observed. This indicated that DNA replicated semiconservatively, allowing each newly synthesized (daughter) strand to remain associated with the parental (template) strand.

== Models of replication ==
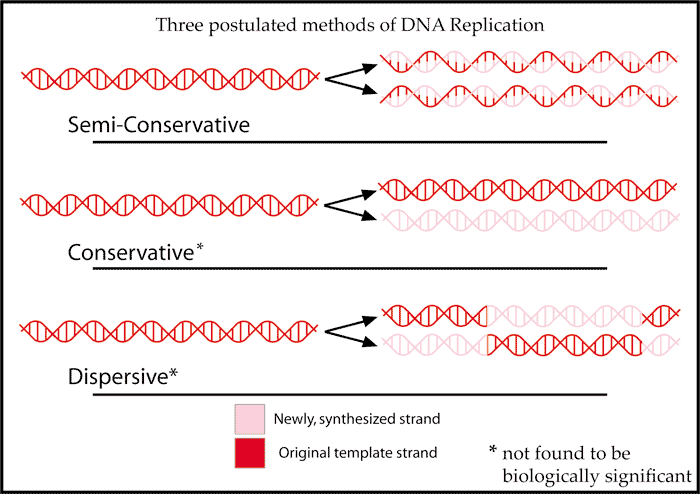
Three postulated methods of DNA synthesis

Semiconservative replication was one of three models originally proposed for DNA replication, the other two being conservative and dispersive replication.

- In the conservative model of replication, the original double helix acts as a template while remaining intact to produce a copy composed of two new strands
- In the semiconservative model of replication, the parental strands separate to each bind with a daughter strand.
- In the dispersive model of replication, the two copies of the DNA produced would contain a mix of original and newly synthesized DNA.

The experimental evidence of the Meselson-Stahl experiment established semiconservative replication as the accepted DNA replication mechanism.

== DNA strand separation ==
For semiconservative replication to occur, the DNA double-helix needs to be separated so the new template strand can be bound to the complementary base pairs. This process involves unwinding the helix by the helicase enzyme, Topoisomerase relieving the strains of the unwinding, preventing them from becoming too tightly wound.

== Rate and accuracy ==
The rate of semiconservative DNA replication in a living cell was first measured in T4 phage-infected E. coli. The results suggested that the DNA strands are elongated by the quick addition of nucleotides, while the low mutation rates indicated high precision of the replication process. Thus, the process remains accurate with the help of repair and proofreading mechanisms.

== Biological significance ==
Semiconservative replication ensures accurate genetic information transmission between generations. Since one of the original strands is retained, this serves as a template for error correction via cellular mechanisms that repair mismatched base pairs In some organisms, the parental and daughter strands can be distinguished by methylating the parent strand, allowing the repair mechanisms to correct any errors in the newly synthesized strand. Occasionally, despite high accuracy, persisting errors can contribute genetic variation.

== See also ==
- Molecular Structure of Nucleic Acids: A Structure for Deoxyribose Nucleic Acid
- DNA replication
