= Bacterial genetics =

Subfield of genetics involving study of bacterial genes

Bacterial genetics is the subfield of genetics devoted to the study of bacterial genes. Bacterial genetics are subtly different from eukaryotic genetics, however bacteria still serve as a good model for animal genetic studies. One of the major distinctions between bacterial and eukaryotic genetics stems from the bacteria's lack of membrane-bound organelles (this is true of all prokaryotes. While it is a fact that there are prokaryotic organelles, they are never bound by a lipid membrane, but by a shell of proteins), necessitating protein synthesis occur in the cytoplasm.

Like other organisms, bacteria also breed true and maintain their characteristics from generation to generation, yet at the same time, exhibit variations in particular properties in a small proportion of their progeny. Though heritability and variations in bacteria had been noticed from the early days of bacteriology, it was not realised then that bacteria too obey the laws of genetics. Even the existence of a bacterial nucleus was a subject of controversy. The differences in morphology and other properties were attributed by Nageli in 1877, to bacterial pleomorphism, which postulated the existence of a single, a few species of bacteria, which possessed a protein capacity for a variation. With the development and application of precise methods of pure culture, it became apparent that different types of bacteria retained constant form and function through successive generations. This led to the concept of monomorphism.

== Transformation ==
Transformation in bacteria was first observed in 1928 by Frederick Griffith and later (in 1944) examined at the molecular level by Oswald Avery and his colleagues who used the process to demonstrate that DNA was the genetic material of bacteria. In transformation, a cell takes up extraneous DNA found in the environment and incorporates it into its genome (genetic material) through recombination. Not all bacteria are competent to be transformed, and not all extracellular DNA is competent to transform. To be competent to transform, the extracellular DNA must be double-stranded and relatively large. To be competent to be transformed, a cell must have the surface protein Competent Factor', which binds to the extracellular DNA in an energy requiring reaction. However bacteria that are not naturally competent can be treated in such a way to make them competent, usually by treatment with calcium chloride, which make them more permeable.

== Bacterial conjugation ==
Bacterial conjugation is the transfer of genetic material (plasmid) between bacterial cells by direct cell-to-cell contact or by a bridge-like connection between two cells. Discovered in 1946 by Joshua Lederberg and Edward Tatum, conjugation is a mechanism of horizontal gene transfer as are transformation and transduction although these two other mechanisms do not involve cell-to-cell contact.

Bacterial conjugation is often regarded as the bacterial equivalent of sexual reproduction or mating since it involves the exchange of genetic material. During conjugation the donor cell provides a conjugative or mobilizable genetic element that is most often a plasmid or transposon. Most conjugative plasmids have systems ensuring that the recipient cell does not already contain a similar element.

The genetic information transferred is often beneficial to the recipient. Benefits may include antibiotic resistance, xenobiotic tolerance or the ability to use new metabolites. Such beneficial plasmids may be considered bacterial endosymbionts. Other elements, however, may be viewed as bacterial parasites and conjugation as a mechanism evolved by them to allow for their spread.

== See also ==
- Microbial genetics
- Ebola virus genetics
