= European Journal of Endocrinology =

- Discipline: Endocrinology
- Language: English
- Edited by: Felix Beuschlein

Publication details
- Former name: Acta Endocrinologica
- History: 1948–present
- Publisher: Oxford University Press on behalf of the European Society of Endocrinology
- Frequency: Monthly
- Open access: Delayed, after 12 months; hybrid
- Impact factor: 5.3 (2023)

Standard abbreviations
- ISO 4: Eur. J. Endocrinol.

Indexing
- CODEN: EJOEEP
- ISSN: 0804-4643 (print); 1479-683X (web)
- OCLC no.: 960784327

Links
- Journal homepage; Online access; online archive

The European Journal of Endocrinology is a monthly peer-reviewed medical journal covering endocrinology with a focus on clinical and translational studies, research, and reviews in paediatric and adult endocrinology. It is the clinical journal of the European Society of Endocrinology. The editor-in-chief is Wiebke Arlt (University of Birmingham). The journal has been published by Bioscientifica since 1999.

== History ==
The journal was established in 1948 as Acta Endocrinologica by a group of Scandinavian endocrinologists. The founding editor-in-chief was Axel Westman. The journal was originally sponsored by the national endocrine societies of Denmark, Finland, Germany, the Netherlands, Norway, Sweden and Switzerland. Over its first four years the journal increased its publication frequency from four issues per year to nine issues; it has been published monthly since 1952.

The editors-in-chief between 1948 and 1994 were Axel Westman, Christian Hamburger, Jörgen Starup, and Christian Binder. Albert G. Burger was the first editor-in-chief under the new name. Hans Romijn became Editor in Chief in 2011 and handed over to Wiebke Arlt in 2018, bringing in additional Deputy Editors to support the Journal. In 2024 Felix Beuschlein assumed the Editor in Chief role.

In 1993 the journal became an official journal of the European Federation of Endocrine Societies (now European Society of Endocrinology). As part of this shift, the journal changed to its current name. In January 2023 the Journal moved publishing houses from Bioscientifica to Oxford University Press.

Having had a broad scope covering both basic and clinical endocrine research since its foundation in 1948, the journal's editorial board announced in 2008 that it would no longer publish basic research but focus on translational and clinical endocrinology. This decision was made to establish the journal as the clinical and translational journal of the European Society of Endocrinology, complementing the Society's other official journals (Journal of Endocrinology, Journal of Molecular Endocrinology and Endocrine-Related Cancer).

Editorial and review content is free to access from publication. Research articles become available for open access after 12 months (delayed open access). In addition, authors can pay an article processing charge upon acceptance to have their article made freely available online immediately upon publication (hybrid open access).

== Abstracting and indexing ==
The journal is abstracted and indexed in:

- Biological Abstracts
- BIOSIS Previews
- CAB Abstracts
- Chemical Abstracts Service
- Current Contents/Clinical Medicine
- Current Contents/Life Sciences
- EBSCO databases
- Embase
- Index Medicus/MEDLINE/PubMed
- PASCAL
- Science Citation Index Expanded
- Scopus

According to the Journal Citation Reports, the journal has a 2020 impact factor of 6.664.
