= Chibnall =

Chibnall is a surname. Notable people with the surname include:

- Albert Chibnall FRS (1894–1988), British biochemist
- Chris Chibnall (born 1970), English television writer and producer
- Marjorie Chibnall OBE FBA (1915–2012), English historian

== See also ==
- Chibal (disambiguation)
- Shobnall
