= Syed Faisal Ahmed =

British physician, peaditrician

S. Faisal Ahmed
- Born: 20 September 1964; London, UK
- Education: University of Edinburgh
- Spouse: Shazia Ahmed
- Children: 2

Syed Faisal Ahmed is British physician and academic who holds the Samson Gemmell Chair of Child Health at the University of Glasgow. Ahmed is an honorary consultant paediatric endocrinologist at the Royal Hospital for Children, Glasgow. and was appointed to this post in 2012, being the seventh clinical academic to hold this endowed professorship which is the oldest chair of paediatrics in the United Kingdom. Since 2019, he has held an additional professorship at Leiden University and Leiden University Medical Center as the Professor of Endocrine Registries.

In 2024, he became Editor-in-Chief of Endocrine Connections, an open access journal owned by the Society for Endocrinology and the European Society of Endocrinology.

== Research ==
Ahmed's research has received funding from several sources and has gained international attention in a wide range of research activities. His pioneering work in skeletal development has provided deep insight into the role of the GH/IGF-1 system as well as led to innovative methods of assessing bone quality. His research in sex development has had impact in several areas but, most importantly, he developed and continues to lead a highly successful international research consortium that started as the International DSD Registry (I-DSD). To improve the health of people in Scotland with DSD he founded the Scottish DSD Network in 2005, one of the first national managed clinical networks in Scotland; in the UK and internationally, he led the development of the UK DSD consensus guidelines and, was one of the members of the 2005 Chicago Consensus group.

== Rare Disease Registries ==
Ahmed's interest in rare disease registries started when he was working at the Department of Paediatrics at the University of Cambridge in the 1990s on a group of conditions affecting sex development. This early work showed the value of collecting standardised data on a very rare condition. On returning to Scotland he started working on the development of a rare disease registry for these conditions and which has now evolved into an international registry platform for a wider family of conditions affecting sex development and maturation. Following the formation of European Reference Networks in 2017, Ahmed led the development of a rare disease registry platform, EuRRECa, that was used by Endo-ERN and later by ERN-BOND, as EuRR-Bone. In 2025, this project merged into EuRREB and its coordination and operation was completely handed over to LUMC. In 2022, Ahmed was approached by the pharmaceutical industry to develop a new project that supported post-approval safety and effectiveness studies for multiple novel endocrine therapies through a brand and condition agnostic registry platform. The resulting project, GloBE-Reg, has ushered in a new era of international collaboration between a wide range of stakeholders including clinicians, patients, industry and scientific societies.

== Awards ==
In 2021, Ahmed was awarded the 2021 ESPE Research Award for his scientific contributions to the field of paediatric endocrinology.

Academic offices
Preceded by Lawrence Weaver	Syed Faisal Ahmed	Vacant
