= Claire Wathes =

British veterinary researcher

(Dorothy) Claire Wathes née Bulman (born 1953) is a British veterinary researcher who studies the reproduction of farm animals. She is known for her work on infertility in dairy cattle. As of 2018, she is a professor of veterinary reproduction at the Royal Veterinary College in Hatfield.

== Education and career ==
Wathes gained a BSc in zoology from the University of Birmingham in 1974. Her PhD on fertility in dairy cattle was from the University of Nottingham in 1978, under the supervision of Eric Lamming; her thesis was entitled "Progesterone levels and fertility of lactating cows". In 1990, she was awarded a DSc by the University of Bristol.

Her first postdoctoral post was at the Babraham Institute in Cambridge. From 1979 to 1990, she worked in the University of Bristol's Department of Anatomy, holding positions successively as lecturer and reader, before rejoining the Babraham Institute as a project leader (1990–94). She has been professor of veterinary reproduction at the Royal Veterinary College since 1994, leading the college's Reproduction and Development Group from 1995 to 2007. She also holds a guest professorship at Huazhong Agricultural University in China (since 2009).

From 2000 to 2008, Wathes chaired "ARK-Genomics", the steering committee of the Biotechnology and Biological Sciences Research Council Investigating Gene Function Initiative for livestock, which aimed to facilitate genomics research across the UK. She became the first director of the Farm Animal Genetics and Genomics Faraday Partnership in 2002, and she continues to serve on a committee of its successor body, the Knowledge Transfer Network. She also served on the veterinary advisory committee of the Horserace Betting Levy Board (from 1997 until 2006 or 2008).

== Research ==
The long-term focus of Wathes' research has been reproduction in domestic ruminants, including cattle and sheep. Fertility in dairy cattle, and the problem of infertility, have formed an important part of her work from the outset. In her early research in Nottingham, with Lamming and others, she developed a method to diagnose and monitor low fertility in cows by measuring levels of the progesterone hormone in their milk. Her subsequent research at the Royal Veterinary College has investigated what causes cows to have low fertility, including their genetic background, nutrition and metabolic status, as well as bacterial infection of the uterus after calving. She has shown that lack of sufficient nutrients is an important cause of infertility.

While working at Bristol she showed, with Ray Swann, that the oxytocin hormone is produced in the corpus luteum of the ovary in sheep and other ruminants, as well as in the neurohypophysis. This might form part of the mechanism by which female ruminants detect whether or not they have conceived. She has subsequently studied how hormonal and other factors regulate the oestrus cycle and the birthing process in sheep and cows.

== Awards and societies ==
Wathes is an elected fellow of the Royal Agricultural Society of England (RASE) and the Royal Society of Biology. She has served on the council of the Royal Society of Biology since 2017, and has also held roles on the committees of several other learned societies, including the European Society of Domestic Animal Reproduction, the Society for Endocrinology and the Society for Reproduction and Fertility.

Her awards include RASE's Research Medal (2006) for her work on fertility in dairy cattle, and the Society for Reproduction and Fertility's Marshall Medal (2015).

== Personal life ==
She was married to Christopher Wathes, also a veterinary researcher; he died in 2016.

== Selected publications ==
- DC Bulman, GE Lamming (1978). Milk progesterone levels in relation to conception, repeat breeding and factors influencing acyclicity in dairy cows. Journal of Reproduction and Fertility 54: 447–58 doi:10.1530/jrf.0.0540447
- DC Wathes, RW Swann (1982). Is oxytocin an ovarian hormone? Nature 297: 225–27 doi:10.1038/297225a0
- DC Wathes, DRE Abayasekara, RJ Aitken (2007). Polyunsaturated fatty acids in male and female reproduction. Biology of Reproduction, 77: 190–201 doi:10.1095/biolreprod.107.060558
- DC Wathes, Z Cheng, W Chowdhury et al. (2009). Negative energy balance alters global gene expression and immune responses in the uterus of postpartum dairy cows. Physiological Genomics 39: 1–13 doi:10.1152/physiolgenomics.00064.2009
