= Tom Blundell =

British biochemist

Sir Tom Blundell FRS FRSC FMedSci FRSB MAE
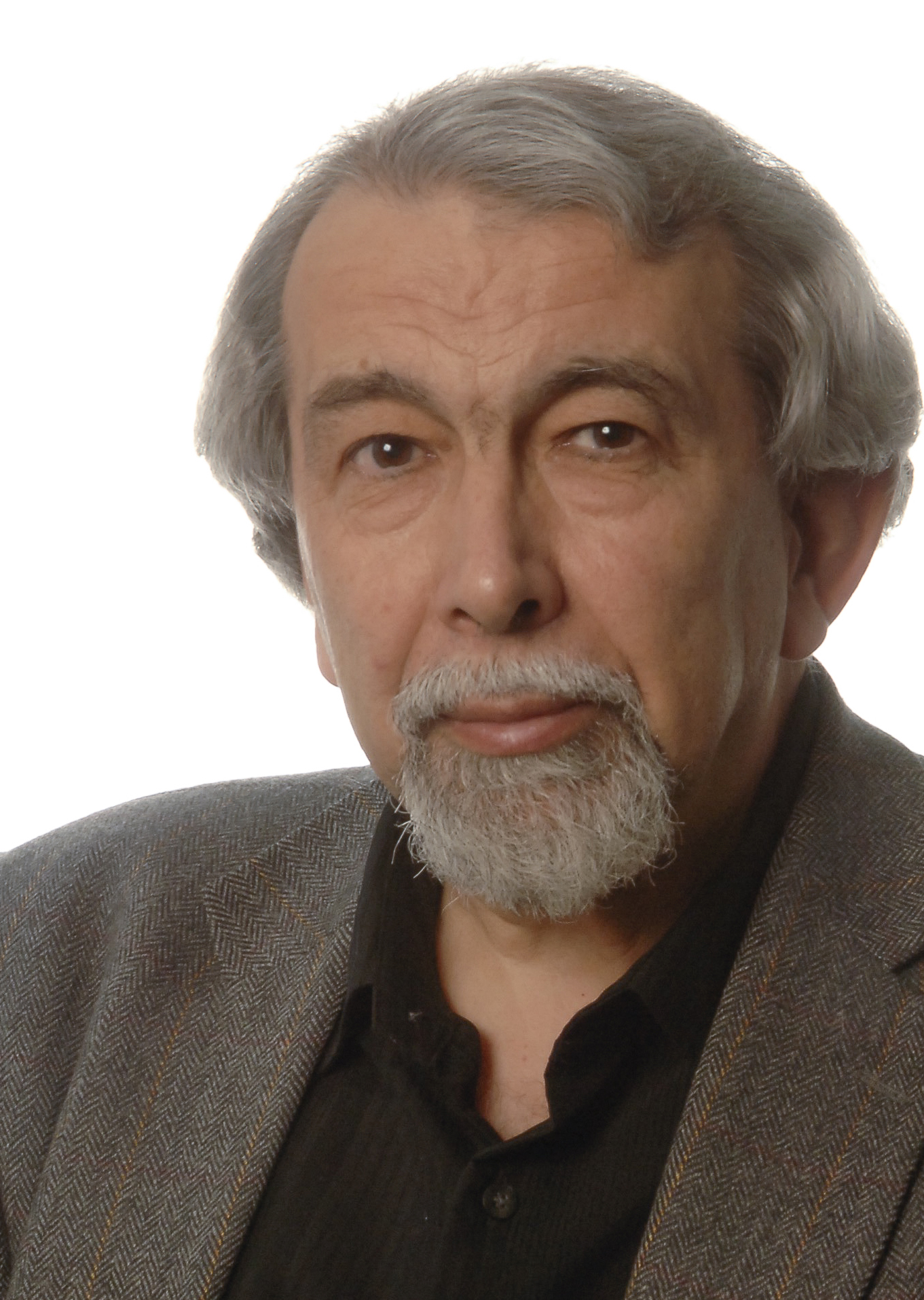
- Blundell in 2006
- Born: Thomas Leon Blundell; 7 July 1942 (age 84); Brighton, England, UK
- Education: Steyning Grammar School; University of Oxford (BA, DPhil)
- Known for: Astex; Insulin structure; Drug design
- Spouse: Lady Bancinyane Lynn Sibanda (m. 1987)
- Children: 3
- Awards: Knight Bachelor (1997); EMBO Member (1986); Honorary Doctorates from 16 universities
- Scientific career
- Fields: Structural biology; Bioinformatics; Biochemistry; Drug Discovery
- Workplaces: University of Cambridge; University of Oxford; University of Sussex; Birkbeck, University of London; Biotechnology and Biological Sciences Research Council; Agricultural and Food Research Council; Astex
- Thesis: The determination by X-ray diffraction methods of the crystal and molecular structures of some co-ordination compounds (1969)
- Doctoral advisor: Herbert M Powell
- Doctoral students: Tim Hubbard; Laurence Pearl; Andrej Šali; Charlotte Deane
- Website: www.bioc.cam.ac.uk/research/blundell

Sir Thomas Leon Blundell, FRS FRSC FMedSci MAE (born 7 July 1942) is a British biochemist, structural biologist, and science administrator. He was a member of the team of Dorothy Hodgkin that solved in 1969 the first structure of a protein hormone, insulin. Blundell has made contributions to the structural biology of polypeptide hormones, growth factors, receptor activation, signal transduction, and DNA double-strand break repair, subjects important in cancer, tuberculosis, and familial diseases. He has developed software for protein modelling and understanding the effects of mutations on protein function, leading to new approaches to structure-guided and Fragment-based lead discovery. In 1999 he co-founded the oncology company Astex Therapeutics, which has moved ten drugs into clinical trials. Blundell has played central roles in restructuring British research councils and, as President of the UK Science Council, in developing professionalism in the practice of science.

== Education ==
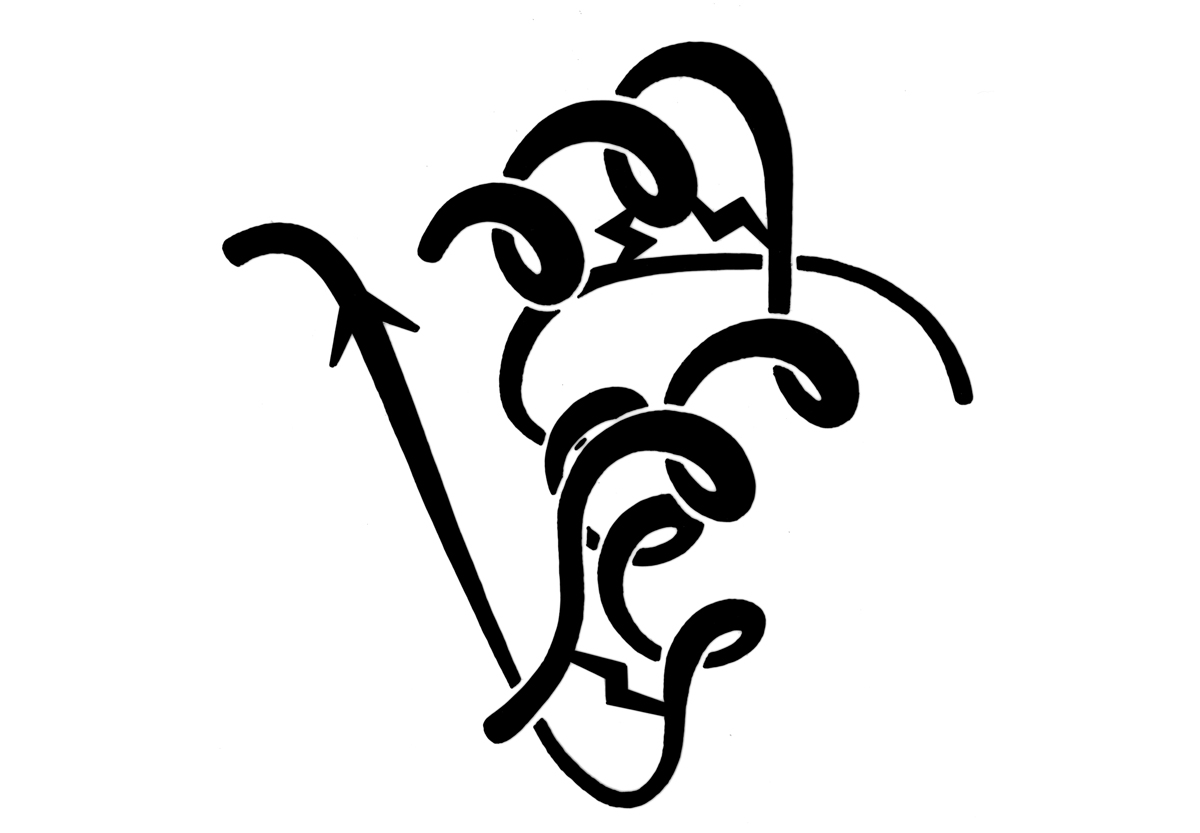
Insulin monomer

Born in Brighton in 1942, Blundell was educated at Steyning Grammar School. He was the first in his family to attend university, winning an Open Scholarship to the University of Oxford. He earned a First Class degree in Natural Sciences in 1964, then moved to research in the Department of Chemical Crystallography, first with Herbert Marcus Powell FRS for his Doctor of Philosophy degree and later working on insulin with Dorothy Hodgkin. He was a Junior Research Fellow at Linacre College, University of Oxford, where he is now an Honorary Fellow.

== Career and research ==
Blundell's early posts were at the University of Oxford and the University of Sussex. In 1976, Blundell joined the Department of Crystallography at Birkbeck, University of London, becoming head of department in 1978.

In 1991, while continuing academic research, he moved further into science administration and policy, as Director General of the Agricultural and Food Research Council (1991–94) and then the founding Chief Executive of the Biotechnology and Biological Sciences Research Council (BBSRC) (1994–1996). He is a former president of the Biosciences Federation (2004–06). In June 2011 he became President of the Science Council.

In 1995 he became the fifth Sir William Dunn Professor of Biochemistry and head of the Department of Biochemistry at the University of Cambridge; he currently also holds the Chair of the School of Biological Sciences at that university. He is a fellow of Sidney Sussex College. His speciality is molecular biology and his research on identifying the chemical processes of diseases has led to the development of drugs to treat AIDS, cancer, cataracts and diabetes. He is the co-founder of two drug discovery companies, Astex Technology Ltd and Biofabrika.

On 15 September 2010, Blundell, along with 54 other public figures, signed an open letter published in The Guardian, stating their opposition to Pope Benedict XVI's state visit to the UK.

Blundell has been active on environmental issues, first as Chair of the Planning Committee of the Oxford City Council (1970–73), during the time when it stopped the building of a motorway through the city centre, pedestrianised much of the historic centre, and made North Oxford a conservation area. From 1998 to 2005 he was Chair of the Royal Commission on Environmental Pollution, when he oversaw the production of key reports such as those on Energy – the Changing Climate, Chemicals in Products – Safeguarding the Environment and Human Health, and Turning the Tide: Addressing the Impact of Fisheries on the Marine Environment. He is a Distinguished Member of Humanists UK.

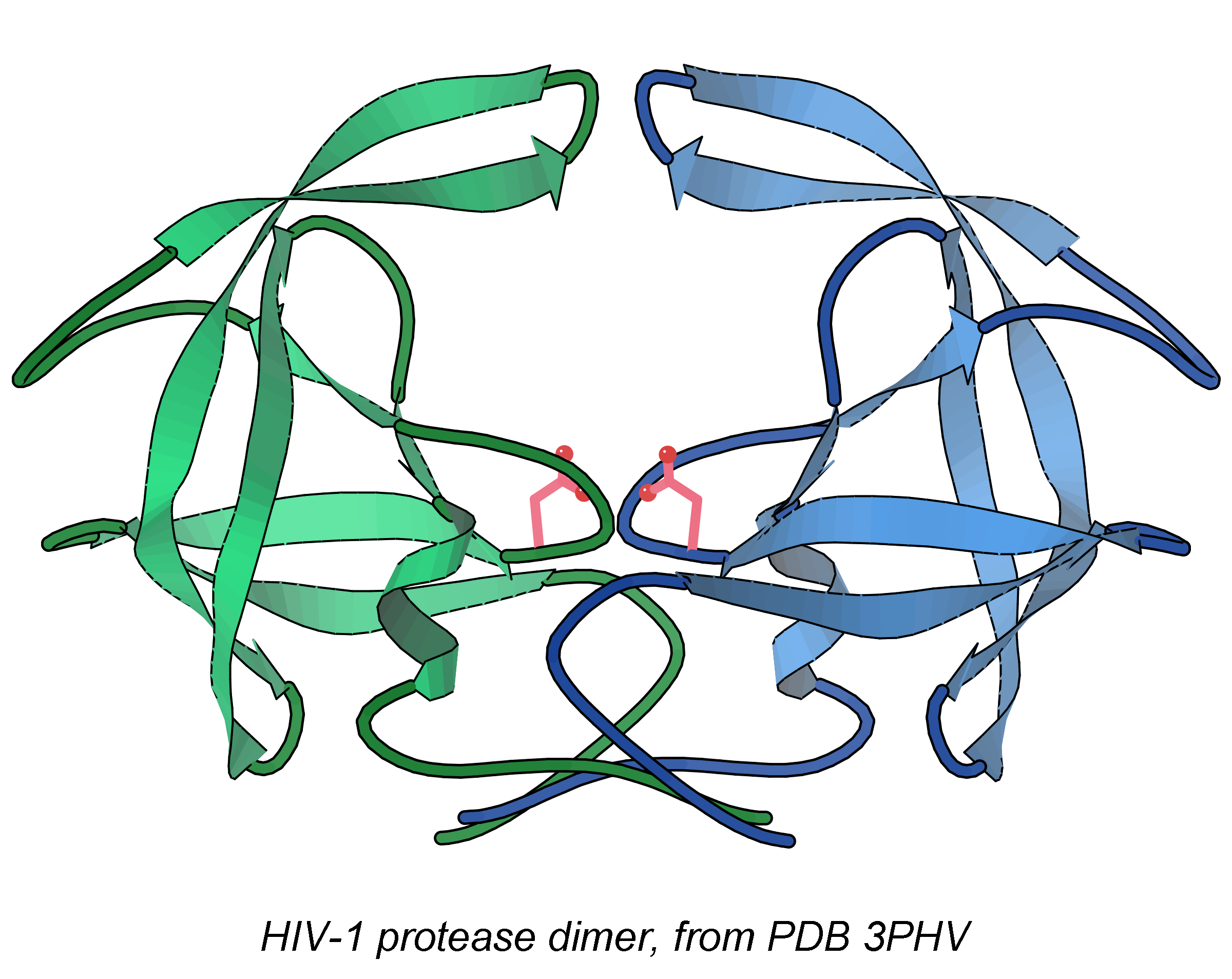
Original 1989 structure of the HIV protease dimer, from PDB 3PHV

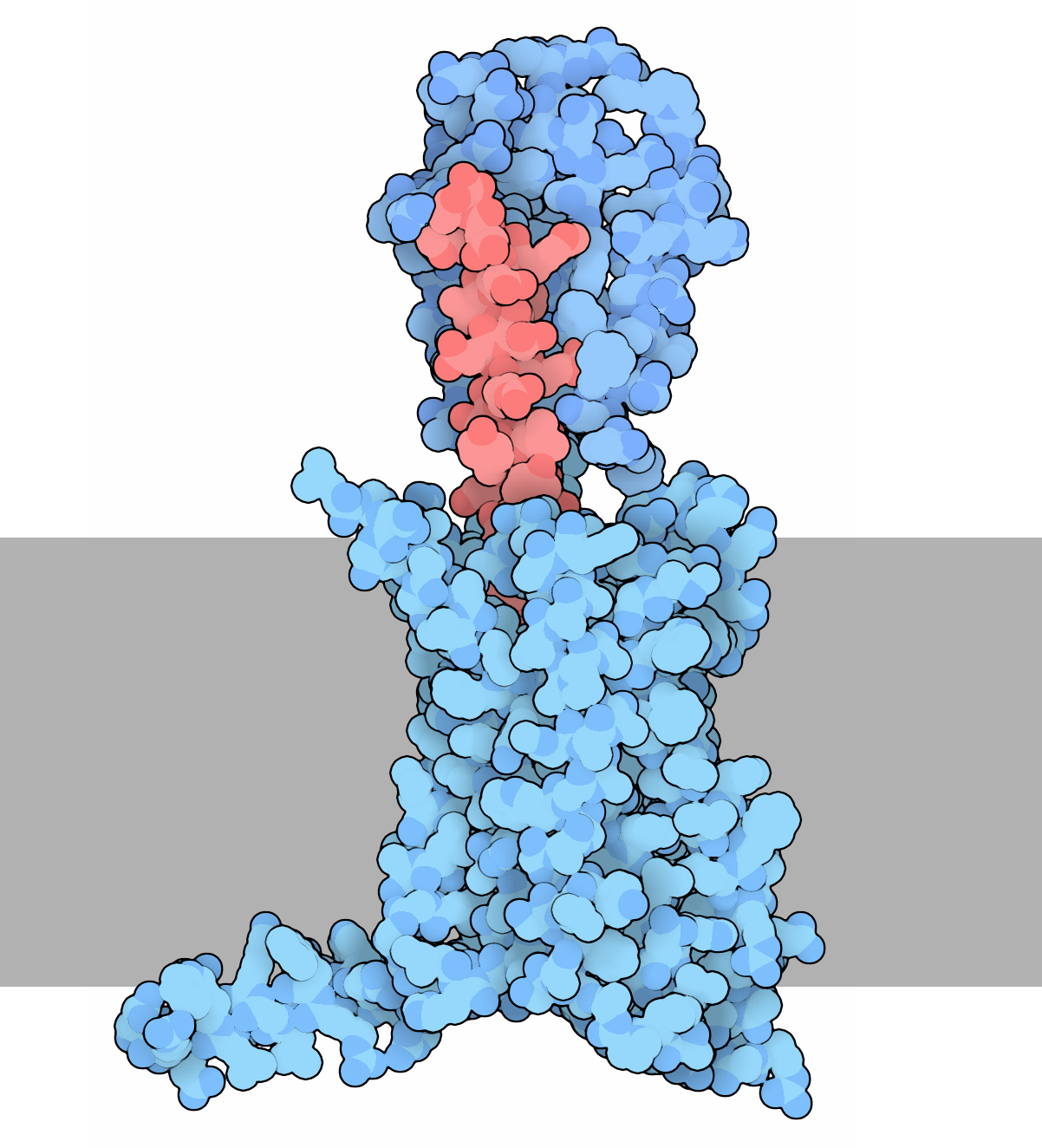
Glucagon hormone (red) bound to its membrane receptor

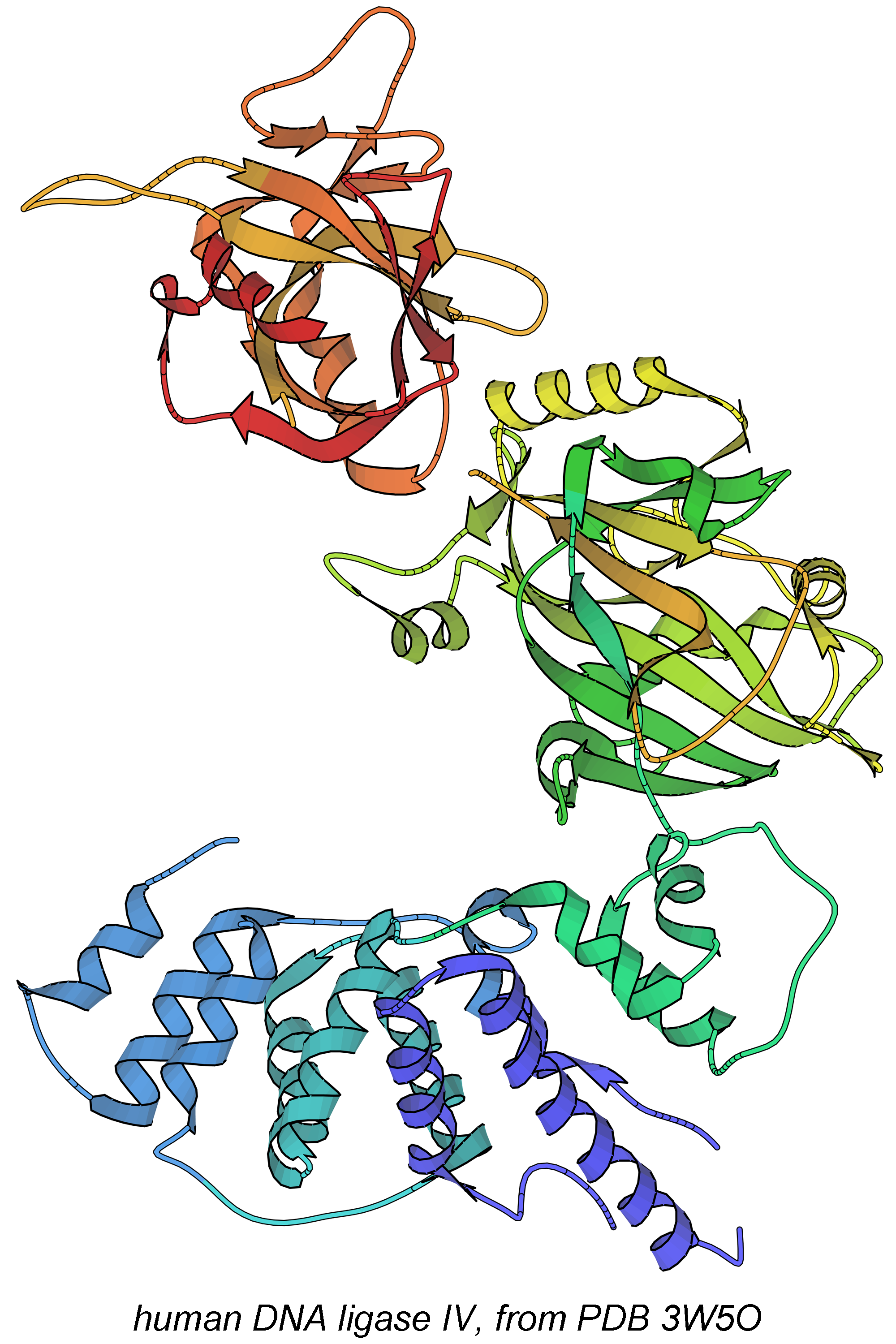
Human DNA ligase IV, from PDB 3W5O.

Blundell's research interests lie in elucidating the architecture and function of macromolecules and their multi-component assemblies using methods from biochemistry, protein crystallography, and bioinformatics, with the objectives of understanding biological function, of knowledge-based prediction of structure, and of discovering new therapeutics for cancer and tuberculosis. Systems studied include DNA repair, hormones, growth factors and hormone/receptor interactions, cellular signalling, crystallins (lens proteins), renin and HIV protease. He has contributed 235 crystal structures to the worldwide Protein Data Bank (accessed 3/3/16). At least seven of the Molecule-of-the-Month features at the RCSB site of the worldwide Protein Databank have featured molecular structures solved and studied by the Blundell lab, such as the glucagon hormone shown at left in David Goodsell's drawing, nerve growth factor, the RAD51-BRCA2 DNA recombination complex, and the DNA ligase shown at right. His group has written several broadly used bioinformatics programs. He co-authored a textbook on protein crystallography with Louise Johnson, which was translated into French and Russian.

=== Doctoral students and postdocs ===
Blundell has supervised numerous Doctor of Philosophy students and postdoctoral researchers in his lab including Tim Hubbard, Laurence Pearl, Andrej Šali, and Charlotte Deane.

=== Awards and honours ===
Blundell was elected a Fellow of the Royal Society (FRS) in 1984. His nomination reads:

Professor of Crystallography, Birkbeck College, University of London. Distinguished for his work on crystal and molecular structures and biochemistry of protein hormones, enzymes, and proteins of the eye lens. He had an outstanding part in solution of the insulin crystal structure. He has related his structure for glucagon to receptor binding of this hormone. In chemically modified insulins he has studied structure-function relationships and he has proposed a model for the evolution of insulin. His work on avian pancreatic polypeptide, the acid proteinases from mammals and fungi and the proteins of the eye lens is characterised by similar extensive detail from which he disects [sic] important structural relationships and derives principles and guides on protein evolution and hormone (especially growth hormone) function.

Blundell became one of the first fellows of the Academy of Medical Sciences in 1998. He was elected a member of the European Molecular Biology Organisation (EMBO) in 1985; A member of the Academia Europaea in 1993; Founding Member, Academy of Medical Sciences 1999. International recognition has come in his election as a Foreign Member of the Indian National Science Academy, the Chilean Academy and The World Academy of Sciences TWAS.

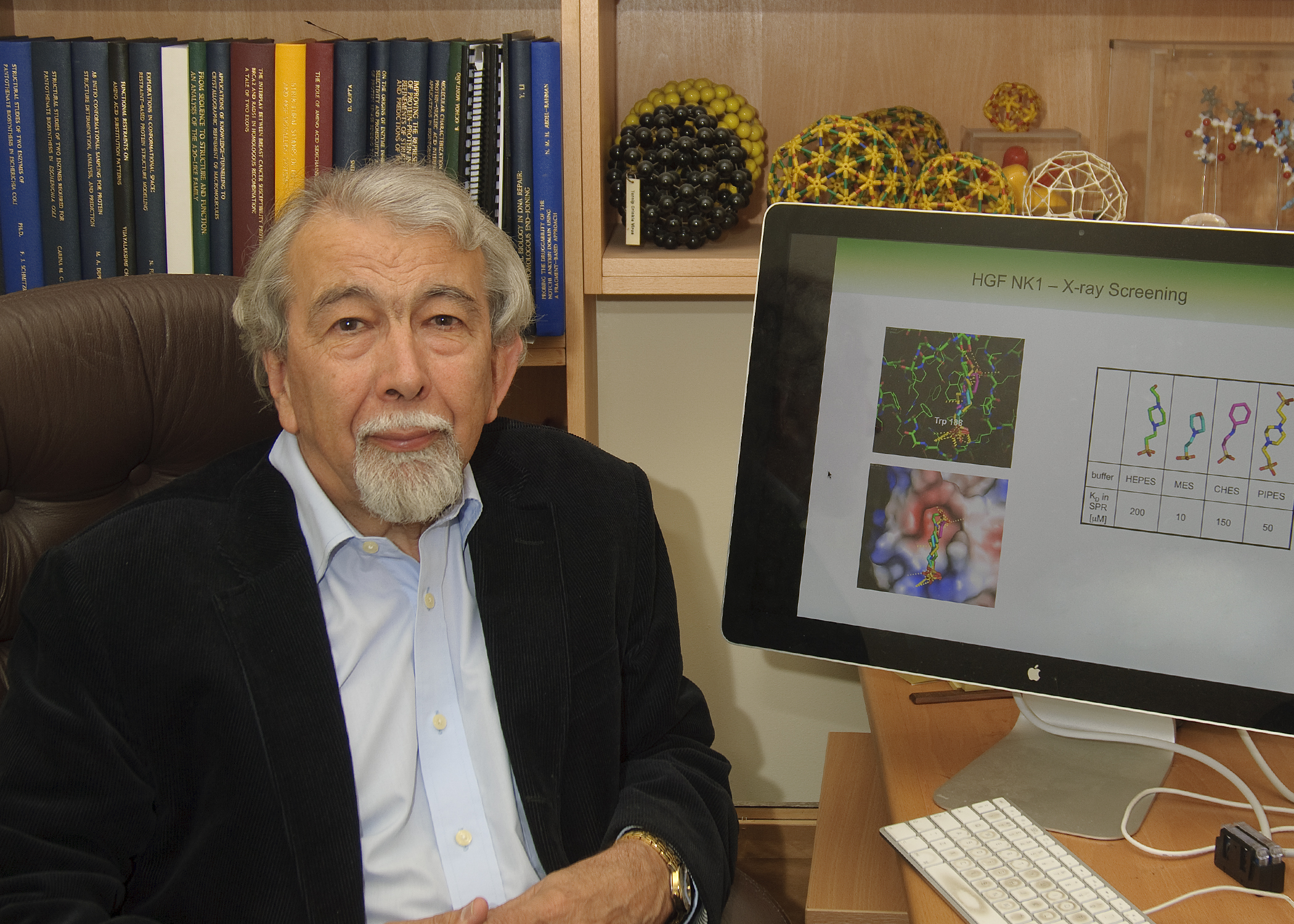
Sir Tom Blundell in his office at the University of Cambridge, UK

Blundell has received numerous awards and medals, including the Alcon Award for Vision Research in 1986; Gold Medal, Institute of Biotechnology in 1987; Krebs Medal FEBS 1987; Ciba Medal, Biochemical Society in 1988; Feldberg Prize in Biology and Medicine in 1988; Gold Medal, Society of Chemical Industry in 1996; First Recipient, Pfizer European Prize for Innovation in 1998 and Bernal Lecture, Royal Society 1998. He received the 2013 Biochemical Society Award and Cambridge University Science Prize called the Philosophical Society Fellows Prize & Lecture 2014. Most recently in 2017 he received the 11th IUCr Ewald Prize. He has been President, UK Biosciences Federation (2003–2009); President, Biochemical Society (2009–2011); and President, UK Science Council (since 2011).

Blundell's contributions were recognised by a knighthood in 1997. He has been awarded Honorary Doctorate degrees from 16 universities and was interviewed by Kirsty Young on the BBC Radio 4 programme Desert Island Discs in 2007.

== Personal life ==
Blundell married Lady Bancinyane Lynn Sibanda in 1987 and has three children. His brother is the economist Richard Blundell.

Blundell was elected to the Oxford City Council in 1970 as a Labour councillor for the St. Clement’s Ward.

Academic offices
| Preceded by Hans Kornberg | Sir William Dunn Professor of Biochemistry, Cambridge University; 1995–2009 | Succeeded by Gerard Evan |
Government offices
| Preceded by - | CEO of the Biotechnology and Biological Sciences Research Council; 1994–1996 | Succeeded by Ray Baker |
