= Christian Hamburger =

Danish endocrinologist

- Born: February 19, 1904; Copenhagen, Denmark
- Died: October 6, 1992 (aged 88)
- Occupation: Endocrinologist
- Known for: Christine Jorgensen sex reassignment Chief editor of Acta Endocrinologica

Christian Hamburger (19 February 1904 – 6 October 1992) was a Danish endocrinologist. He worked in Copenhagen and was the doctor responsible for Christine Jorgensen's sex reassignment, and she would choose her name in honor of him.

== Career ==
Hamburger was born into a wealthy Copenhagen family in 1904; his father was a physician. He completed his medical training in Copenhagen from 1928 to 1932. He began working in the field of endocrinology in 1930, and after completing a doctoral thesis in 1933, he became head of the Hormone Department of Statens Serum Institut, a medical research institute. In 1936, he studied in New York for six months with a scholarship from the Rockefeller Foundation. He co-founded the Danish Society for Endocrinology in 1947 and was the society's chairman from its foundation until 1972. When Acta Endocrinologica (now the European Journal of Endocrinology), the official publication of the European Society of Endocrinology, was established in 1948, Hamburger was appointed an associate editor; he was chief editor of the journal from 1960 until his retirement in 1973.

Hamburger's early research was focused on gonadotropins. He was the first to show that the urine of castrated males contains follicle-stimulating hormone. His doctoral thesis showed that the gonadotropin hormone present in the urine of pregnant women is produced by chorionic tissue rather than the pituitary gland; he thus named the hormone human chorionic gonadotropin. His later research covered topics including androgen hormones, 17-ketosteroids, antigonadotropins, and methods for administering sex hormones.

Hamburger received international attention in 1952 after treating Christine Jorgensen, an American transgender woman who wanted a male-to-female sex reassignment. Under Hamburger's care, Jorgensen was given estrogen hormone replacement therapy and underwent a penectomy and orchidectomy. Hamburger felt that it was unethical to deny medical treatment to transgender women in order to make their lives "as tolerable as possible". He believed that psychotherapy was futile in these patients. Gordene Olga MacKenzie, the author of the 1994 book Transgender Nation, referred to Hamburger and Harry Benjamin as "the two pioneering figures most responsible for the creation of modern clinical transsexual ideology". She claimed that the Jorgensen case provided the model for contemporary treatment of transgender people in the United States. Richard F. Docter, who authored a 2013 biography of Jorgensen, wrote of Hamburger: "He is seldom credited with being the inventor of the modern protocol for transsexualism, but he was."
