= Ruth Andrew =

Scottish academic pharmacist

Ruth Andrew FRSE FBPhS MRPharmS

Academic background
- Education: University of Strathclyde (PhD, BSc); Barrhead High School

Academic work
- Discipline: Pharmacist
- Sub-discipline: Steroid biochemistry and applied mass spectrometry
- Institutions: University of Edinburgh

Ruth Andrew is a Scottish academic pharmacist and scientist. She is currently the personal chair of pharmaceutical endocrinology at the University of Edinburgh, and she was awarded a Fellowship of the Royal Society of Edinburgh in 2026.

== Early life and education ==
Andrew attended Barrhead High School. In 1985, she studied pharmacy at the University of Strathclyde, and graduated with a Bachelor of Science in 1989. Upon graduation, Andrew attend the Royal Pharmaceutical Society of Great Britain and qualified to practice as a pharmacist.

In 1990, Andrew went back to the University of Strathclyde and studied pharmaceutical chemistry. In 1994, she obtained a Doctor of Philosophy.

== Career ==
In 1994, Andrew became a lecturer at the University of Edinburgh. In 1995, she joined the Society for Endocrinology.

From June 2012 to August 2016, Andrew was an external examiner for the University of Bradford. In 2015, she was appointed personal chair of pharmaceutical endocrinology at the University.

In 2021, Andrew was elected as the general secretary of the Society for Endocrinology. In 2024, she was appointed the editor-in-chief for the Journal of Endocrinology and the Journal of Molecular Endocrinology. In 2026, Andrew was elected a Fellow of the Royal Society of Edinburgh, in the discipline of biomedical and cognitive sciences.

== Research ==
Andrew's research focus is on steroid hormone action in metabolic disease, and mass spectrometry innovations to understand steroid biochemistry and lipid biology.

In April 2019, Andrew was a senior author of a study that looked into 55,000 men who were given 5α-Reductase inhibitors for prostate treatment. Over an 11 year period, the study found out that there was an increase risk of developing type 2 diabetes when taking those inhibitors for treatment.

To date, Andrew has authored or co-authored over 200 publications.

== Selected publications ==
- Andrew, R.; Watson, D. G.; Best, S. A.; Midgley, J. M.; Wenlong, H.; Petty, R. K. H. (November 1993). "The determination of hydroxydopamines and other trace amines in the urine of Parkinsonian patients and normal controls". Neurochemical Research. 18 (11): 1175–1177. doi:10.1007/BF00978370. ISSN 0364-3190.
- Andrew, Ruth; Phillips, David I. W.; Walker, Brian R. (1 May 1998). "Obesity and Gender Influence Cortisol Secretion and Metabolism in Man". The Journal of Clinical Endocrinology and Metabolism. 83 (5). Oxford University Press: 1806. doi:10.1210/jcem.83.5.4951. ISSN 0021-972X.
- Rask, Eva; Olsson, Tommy; Soderberg, Stefan; Andrew, Ruth; Livingstone, Dawn E. W.; Johnson, Owe; Walker, Brian R. (1 March 2001). "Tissue-Specific Dysregulation of Cortisol Metabolism in Human Obesity". The Journal of Clinical Endocrinology and Metabolism. 86 (3). Oxford University Press: 1418–1421. doi:10.1210/jcem.86.3.7453. ISSN 0021-972X. PMID 11238541.
- Rask, Eva; Walker, Brian R.; Söderberg, Stefan; Livingstone, Dawn E. W.; Eliasson, Mats; Johnson, Owe; Andrew, Ruth; Olsson, Tommy (1 July 2002). "Tissue-Specific Changes in Peripheral Cortisol Metabolism in Obese Women: Increased Adipose 11β-Hydroxysteroid Dehydrogenase Type 1 Activity". The Journal of Clinical Endocrinology & Metabolism. 87 (7): 3330–3336. doi:10.1210/jcem.87.7.8661. ISSN 0021-972X.
- Brunner, E. J.; Hemingway, H.; Walker, B. R.; Page, M.; Clarke, P.; Juneja, M.; Shipley, M. J.; Kumari, M.; Andrew, R.; Seckl, J. R.; Papadopoulos, A.; Checkley, S.; Rumley, A.; Lowe, G. D. O.; Stansfeld, S. A.; Marmot, M. G. (19 November 2002). "Adrenocortical, Autonomic, and Inflammatory Causes of the Metabolic Syndrome: Nested Case-Control Study". Circulation. 106 (21). Lippincott Williams & Wilkins: 2659–2665. doi:10.1161/01.CIR.0000038364.26310.BD. ISSN 0009-7322.
- Boonen, Eva; Vervenne, Hilke; Meersseman, Philippe; Andrew, Ruth; Mortier, Leen; Declercq, Peter E.; Vanwijngaerden, Yoo-Mee; Spriet, Isabel; Wouters, Pieter J.; Vander Perre, Sarah; Langouche, Lies; Vanhorebeek, Ilse; Walker, Brian R.; Van den Berghe, Greet (18 April 2013). "Reduced Cortisol Metabolism during Critical Illness". New England Journal of Medicine. 368 (16). Massachusetts Medical Society: 1477–1488. doi:10.1056/NEJMoa1214969. ISSN 0028-4793. PMC 4413428. PMID 23506003.
