= Robert Insall =

British cell biologist

Professor Robert Insall FRSE
- Born: 1965 (age 60–61); London
- Citizenship: U.K.
- Education: BA (Hons) University of Cambridge, PhD Cambridge University, Post-doctoral training Johns Hopkins University
- Scientific career
- Fields: Cell Biology, Systems Biology, Cancer Biology
- Workplaces: University College London, University of Glasgow
- Thesis: A candidate receptor for DIF in Dictyostelium. (1990)
- Doctoral advisor: Rob Kay
- Other academic advisors: Peter N. Devreotes

Robert Insall is a professor of computational cell biology at University College London and the University of Glasgow. His work focuses on how eukaryotic cells move, and how they choose the direction in which they move. He is known for demonstrating that cells can spread in the body and find their way through mazes by creating gradients of chemoattractants.

== Career ==
Insall performed his PhD work at the MRC Laboratory of Molecular Biology, working with developmental biologist Rob Kay, and his post-doctoral training with Peter Devreotes at Johns Hopkins University. After holding positions at the MRC Laboratory for Molecular Cell Biology at University College London, the University of Birmingham and the University of Glasgow, he moved to University College London in 2023. His laboratory is currently located in the Darwin Building in Bloomsbury. He was elected as a Fellow of the Royal Society of Edinburgh in 2014.

=== Key scientific contributions ===
With Laura Machesky, he identified an important signaling pathway that controls the behavior of the actin cytoskeleton. Insall later proposed that chemotaxis, the process by which cells move towards sources of nutrients or other chemoattractants, is not driven by signaling from the cell membrane but instead by influencing the rate or direction of the extension of pseudopodia, protrusions that the cell uses to move. He later introduced the idea that instead of responding to pre-formed chemoattractant gradients, cells generate these gradients themselves by degrading the chemoattractant. He showed that the spread of cancer cells in melanoma is driven by this mechanism, and that cells migrating through a maze can tell the difference between short arms of the maze and long arms because the chemoattractant in a short arm is degraded more rapidly, allowing them to avoid getting lost.

=== Other activities ===
Insall is a frequent commentator on issues related to science policy, reproducibility, and science publishing. He was chosen by secondary school students as the best communicator in the 2012 I'm a Scientist, Get me out of here! competition for cancer researchers.

== Family ==
Insall's father, Donald Insall, is a noted architect. His wife, Laura Machesky, FRSE, FMedSci is the Dunn Professor of Biochemistry at the University of Cambridge. The two researchers frequently collaborate.
