= Peter N. Devreotes =

American scientist

Peter Nicholas Devreotes
- Citizenship: United States
- Education: University of Wisconsin–Madison, Johns Hopkins University
- Known for: Eukaryotic chemotaxis, Signal transduction, Phosphoinositides biology
- Spouse: Aline Devreotes
- Awards: E.B. Wilson Medal(2019), American Society for Cell Biology Inaugural Lifetime fellow (2016), Member of the National Academy of Sciences (2005)
- Scientific career
- Fields: Cell biology, biophysics, systems biology
- Workplaces: Johns Hopkins School of Medicine
- Doctoral advisor: Douglas M. Fambrough, PhD
- Notable students: Robert Insall
- Website: devreotes.johnshopkins.edu

Peter N. Devreotes is an American scientist and the Isaac Morris & Lucille Elizabeth Hay Professor and former director of the department of cell biology, with joint appointments in the Center for Cell Dynamics and department of biological chemistry at the Johns Hopkins University School of Medicine. He also serves on the scientific advisory board of the Allen Institute for Cell Science. He is best known for his contribution in the field of eukaryotic chemotaxis, signal transduction, and phosphoinositides biology.

== Education and career ==
Devreotes received his Bachelor of Science degree in physics from University of Wisconsin–Madison in 1971. He next earned his PhD degree in biophysics from the Johns Hopkins University in 1977, where he worked in the laboratory of Dr Douglas Fambrough. He then carried his post-doctoral research in Dr Theodore Steck laboratory at the University of Chicago. Devreotes started his independent career as an assistant professor at the department of biological chemistry]in the Johns Hopkins University School of Medicine in 1980. He was subsequently promoted to the rank of associate professor and then to professor. He served as the director of the biochemistry and molecular biology graduate program from 1990 to 2000. Then he was appointed as the director of the department of cell biology of the Johns Hopkins University School of Medicine in 2000.

As an internationally recognized leader in cell migration, Devreotes was elected to the National Academy of Sciences. He was elected and served as a council member of American Society for Cell Biology. He served in the advisory of the Searle Scholars Program. Devreotes founded Gordon Research Conference on "Gradient Sensing and Directed Cell Migration" in 2005. He currently serves on the Scientific Advisory Board of the Allen Institute for Cell Science.

Devreotes trained more than 75 doctoral students and post-doctoral fellows, many of whom have received senior and distinguished positions in major research institutes (such as University of Michigan, Perelman School of Medicine, Johns Hopkins University, Beatson institute, UTSW, Weill Cornell Medicine, NIAID ) and in different industry. He authored more than 300 scholastic publications including research articles, reviews, book chapters. As of June 2023, he has an h-index of 94 on Google Scholar.

== Research ==
Devreotes is an internationally recognized leader in the field of chemotaxis and signal transduction. Devreotes was the first to identify the chemoattractant receptors and to demonstrate that multiple signalling events are activated asymmetrically at the cells leading edge which led to an understanding of the sophisticated strategies that cells use to precisely sense direction. Subsequent research in Devreotes lab helped to uncover the GPCR kinetics and phosphoinositides biology of the polarity organization in migrating Dictyostelium and leukocyte cells. Inside the scientific community, he is widely credited for bringing system-level understanding and implementing computational analysis of dynamical systems in different cell physiological processes. His recent works focus on the understanding the dynamics of internal feedback loops in signal transduction and cytoskeletal networks that confer the biochemical excitability to the membrane and thus control different morphological and functional properties of the cell.

== Awards and honours ==
Devreotes received several major awards and honors for his contribution to the cell biology and systems biology:

- 2005: Devreotes was elected to the National Academy of Sciences.
- 2005: Devreotes received National Institutes of Health MERIT Award.
- 2009: Devreotes was awarded Isaac Morris & Lucille Elizabeth Hay Professorship in Embryology at the Johns Hopkins University School of Medicine.
- 2016: Devreotes was elected as one of the Inaugural Lifetime fellow of American Society for Cell Biology.
- 2019: Devreotes was awarded E.B. Wilson Medal, the highest honor of American Society for Cell Biology.
