= Tim Hubbard =

Professor of Bioinformatics at King's College London

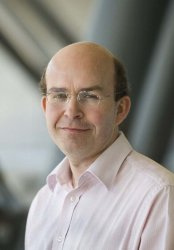
- Born: Timothy John Phillip Hubbard
- Education: University of Cambridge (BA); Birkbeck College, London (PhD)
- Known for: SCOP database; GENCODE; Ensembl; CASP
- Scientific career
- Fields: Bioinformatics; Computational Biology; Genome Informatics
- Workplaces: King's College London; Genomics England; NHS England; Wellcome Trust Sanger Institute
- Thesis: The design, expression and characterisation of a novel protein (1988)
- Doctoral advisor: Tom Blundell
- Website: kclpure.kcl.ac.uk/portal/tim.hubbard.html; www.sanger.ac.uk/external_person/hubbard-tim/

Timothy John Phillip Hubbard is a Professor of Bioinformatics at King's College London, Head of Genome Analysis at Genomics England and Honorary Faculty at the Wellcome Trust Sanger Institute in Cambridge, UK. From 1 March 2024, Hubbard became the director of Europe's Life Science Data Infrastructure ELIXIR.

== Education ==
Hubbard was educated at the University of Cambridge where he was awarded a Bachelor of Arts degree in Natural Sciences (Biochemistry) in 1985. He went on to do research in protein design in the Department of Crystallography, Birkbeck College, London where he was awarded a PhD in 1988 for research supervised by Tom Blundell.

== Research and career ==
Hubbard's research interests are in Bioinformatics, Computational biology and Genome Informatics. During his tenure at WTSI he supervised several successful PhD students to completion in these areas of research.

Following a postdoctoral fellowship at the Protein Engineering Research Institute in Osaka under the EU scientific training program in Japan (1989-90) he returned to Cambridge becoming a Zeneca Fellow at the Medical Research Council (MRC), Centre for Protein Engineering. In 1997 he joined the Wellcome Trust Sanger Institute to become Head of Human Genome Analysis. Tim was Head of Informatics from 2007 to 2013, when he was seconded part time as specialist advisor to NHS England, involved in delivering genomics for health programmes.

Hubbard was appointed Professor of Bioinformatics at King's in October 2013. His research has been published in leading peer reviewed scientific journals including Nature, the Journal of Molecular Biology, Nucleic Acids Research, Genome Biology, Nature Methods, Nature Reviews Cancer and Bioinformatics. His research been funded by the Medical Research Council (MRC) and the Biotechnology and Biological Sciences Research Council (BBSRC).
