= Donald Insall =

British architect, conservationist and author (1926–2026)

Sir Donald Insall CBE
- Born: 7 February 1926; Bristol, England
- Died: 10 October 2026 (aged 100)
- Education: Bristol Grammar School; Royal West of England Academy School of Architecture; Royal Academy of Arts
- Occupations: Architect; conservationist; author
- Spouse: Libby
- Children: 3 including Robert Insall

Sir Donald William Insall CBE (7 February 1926 – 10 October 2026) was a British architect, conservationist and author who has been described as "one of the leading conservation architects of his generation". He was the founder of architectural, conservation and architectural consultancy practice Donald Insall Associates.

== Early life and education ==
Insall was born on 7 February 1926 in Bristol, where he attended Bristol Grammar School. He served in the Coldstream Guards during the Second World War and qualified in architecture at the Royal West of England Academy School of Architecture, now part of the University of Bristol. He then studied at the Royal Academy and its School of Planning.

== Career ==
Insall worked with London architects Phillimore and Jenkins. During 1957, Insall published his report The Care of Old Buildings, marking the 80th anniversary of the founding by William Morris of the Society for the Protection of Ancient Buildings. In 1958, he founded architectural conservation practice Donald Insall Associates and was joined shortly after by Peter Locke (1929–2013), both men having been Lethaby Scholars of the Society for the Protection of Ancient Buildings in 1950.

He was appointed the City of Chester's conservation consultant in 1960, a post he held until 1978.

Donald Insall Associates continues its specialised work in conservation, historic consultancy, adaptive reuse and new buildings in sensitive sites. Insall ran the practice until his retirement in 1998 and continued to be active as a consultant.

== Personal life and death ==
Insall lived on Kew Green in Kew, southwest London. He and his wife, Libby, had two sons and one daughter. His elder son, Robert Insall, is professor of computational cell biology at University College London and a fellow of the Royal Society of Edinburgh. He was a life member of the Royal Photographic Society, which he joined in 1949.

Insall celebrated his 100th birthday on 7 February 2026 and died in London on 10 October 2026.

== Honours ==
In the 1981 Birthday Honours, Insall was appointed an Officer of the Order of the British Empire (OBE). In the 1995 New Year Honours, he was promoted to Commander of the Order (CBE) for services to conservation. Subsequently, he was appointed a Knight Bachelor in the Queen's 2010 Birthday Honours.

In recognition of his conservation work in Chester, Insall received the honorary freedom of the City of Chester in 1999. He also received Europa Nostra's Medal of Honour.

Insall was awarded the honorary degrees of Doctor of Laws from the University of Bristol in 2004 and Doctor of Architecture from the University of Chester in 2012.

== Publications ==
- The Care of Old Buildings, report (1957)
- Chester: A Study in Conservation (1968)
- The Care of Old Buildings Today: A Practical Guide (Architectural Press, 1972)
- Living Buildings: Architectural Conservation, Philosophy, Principles and Practice (Images Publishing Group Pty Ltd, 2008 and 2018)

== Selected projects ==
- Windsor Castle restoration following the 1992 Windsor Castle fire
- Palace of Westminster
- Somerset House
- Garrick's Temple to Shakespeare
- Plumpton Place
- Wotton House
- Chester Conservation Plan
- Market Hall, Monmouth – a new flat roof for the single-storey building, together with a Modernist metal and glass facade at the rear, overlooking the River Monnow, in 1968–69
- Kedleston Hall
- Kelmscott Manor
- Chevening, Kent
- Goldsmiths' Hall, London
- Mansion House, London
- Somerset House, London
- The Holme, Regents Park, London
- The Vyne, Hampshire
- Croft Castle, Herefordshire
- Berrington Hall, Herefordshire
- Speke Hall, Liverpool
- Trafalgar Square paving, London
- Queen Mother Memorial, The Mall, London
