= MRC Laboratory of Medical Sciences =

Biomedical research institute in England

Coordinates: 51.5180°N 0.2345°W

The Medical Research Council (MRC) Laboratory of Medical Sciences (LMS) (formerly the MRC Clinical Sciences Centre, and then the MRC London Institute of Medical Sciences) is a biomedical research institute based in West London, England. Research at the institute focuses on understanding the molecular and physiological basis of health and disease. The LMS was established in 1994 and receives core funding from the Medical Research Council. It is the sister institute of the MRC Laboratory of Molecular Biology at Cambridge. The institute is in partnership with Imperial College London and is located on the campus of Imperial College Healthcare NHS Trust at the Hammersmith Hospital. Since 2023, it has been led by its director, endocrinologist Wiebke Arlt.

== Research ==
The LMS carries out discovery science. Its research aims to understand the fundamental mechanisms that underpin health and disease. The three main areas of research focus at the LMS are i) Genes and the Environment; ii) Sex Differences; and iii) Cell identity across the lifecourse.

== Building ==
The LMS is based across a number of buildings at the Hammersmith Hospital campus in West London, UK. In 2017, a design team was appointed, composed of Hawkins\Brown, Buro Happold, and Abell Nepp, to develop a new home for the LMS. In August 2018, contractors were invited to bid for the construction of the building. In July 2019, the project received planning permission from the London Borough of Hammersmith and Fulham. The new LMS building, completed in December 2022, is based at the Hammersmith Hospital campus on the former site of the MRC cyclotron unit, which was decommissioned and demolished in 2014.
