= Albert Chibnall =

British biochemist

Albert Charles Chibnall
- Born: 28 January 1894; Hammersmith, London
- Died: 10 January 1988 (aged 93); Cambridge, England
- Education: Clare College, Cambridge; Imperial College (PhD)
- Known for: Work on the nitrogen metabolism of plants
- Spouse(s): Helen I C Chibnall (Cicely); Marjorie Morgan
- Scientific career
- Fields: Biochemistry
- Institutions: Chelsea Physic Garden, Connecticut Agricultural Experiment Station, University College London, Imperial College, Cambridge University
- Notable students: Fred Sanger

Albert Charles Chibnall FRS (28 January 1894 – 10 January 1988) was a British biochemist known for his work on the nitrogen metabolism of plants.

== Life and career ==
Albert Charles Chibnall was born on 28 January 1894 in Hammersmith, the second son of George William Chibnall, bakery owner, and Kate (née) Butler. The first and third sons (George William Russell, and Ronald Stanley) were both killed in action in WWI. The oldest child was Isabella Rachel (Belle); there were also two girls who died in infancy.

After attending a small local school, Chibnall moved, aged seven, to Latymer Upper School. This was thought unsuitable and so, after two years, he moved to Colet Court, the preparatory school for St. Paul's, to which he moved in 1907. Chibnall gained an Exhibition to Clare College.

He started off studying for Natural Sciences Tripos Part I, but this was cut short by the advent of war. He quickly applied for a commission, and spent three years serving mainly in the Army Service Corps. In 1917 he applied to join the Royal Flying Corps and learned to fly in Cairo; he gained his wings in 1918.

In 1919 Chibnall was taken on by Professor H B Baker to do research for the newly instituted PhD at Imperial College, but he later switched to study the nitrogenous constituents of green leaves with Professor S. B. Schryver, whom he succeeded in 1929. He gained his PhD in 1921.

After a year's work at the Chelsea Physic Garden, Chibnall was awarded a travelling scholarship to the USA. He secured a place with the leading expert on plant proteins, T B Osborne, at the Connecticut Agricultural Experiment Station.

In 1924 he joined the laboratory of Jack Drummond at University College London. In 1929 Cibnall took over the Chair of Bichemistry at Imperial College. He was appointed the second Sir William Dunn Professor of Biochemistry at Cambridge University in 1943. He resigned in 1949 since he felt it was a role more suited to a medically qualified biochemist.

His notable students included Fred Sanger, who was a double winner of the Nobel Prize for Chemistry. After he was awarded a PhD in 1943 he joined Chibnall's lab. Chibnall suggested Sanger work on methods of identifying the terminal amino acid of Insulin. Chibnall then declined to have his name on Sanger's paper on the grounds that Sanger should get all the credit. Sanger took a similar generous attitude to his students.

== Family ==
Albert Chibnall married his cousin Helen Isabel Cicely Chibnall, known as Cicely, in 1931. They set up home at Long Meadow, in Chiswick Mall. Their first child, Joan, was born in 1933. Cicely died at Queen Charlotte's Isolation Hospital, Hammersmith, on 19 May 1936, giving birth to their second daughter, also Cicely.

In 1947 Chibnall married Marjorie McCallum Morgan, whom he had met after corresponding about one of his historical interests. They had a daughter and a son. Marjorie died in Sheffield on 23 June 2012, aged 96.

Albert Charles Chibnall died in Cambridge on 10 January 1988; he was cremated on the 18th.

== Historical publications ==
- 1950: Subsidy Roll for the County of Buckingham. Anno 1524. Buckinghamshire Record Society
- 1963: Richard de Badew and the University of Cambridge, 1315-1340. Cambridge University Press
- 1965: Sherington: Fiefs and Fields of a Buckinghamshire Village. Cambridge University Press
- 1966: Early taxation returns : taxation of personal property in 1332 and later. Buckinghamshire Record Society
- 1973: The certificate of musters for Buckinghamshire in 1522. Buckinghamshire Record Society
- 1979: Beyond Sherington: the early history of the region of Buckinghamshire lying to the north-east of Newport Pagnell. Phillimore

Academic offices
Preceded by S. B. Shryver	Professor of Biochemistry, Imperial College, London -	Succeeded by
Preceded by Frederick Hopkins	Sir William Dunn Professor of Biochemistry, Cambridge University; 1943 - 1949	Succeeded by Frank George Young
