= Betty Hay =

Cell biologist and Developmental biologist

Elizabeth Dexter "Betty" Hay
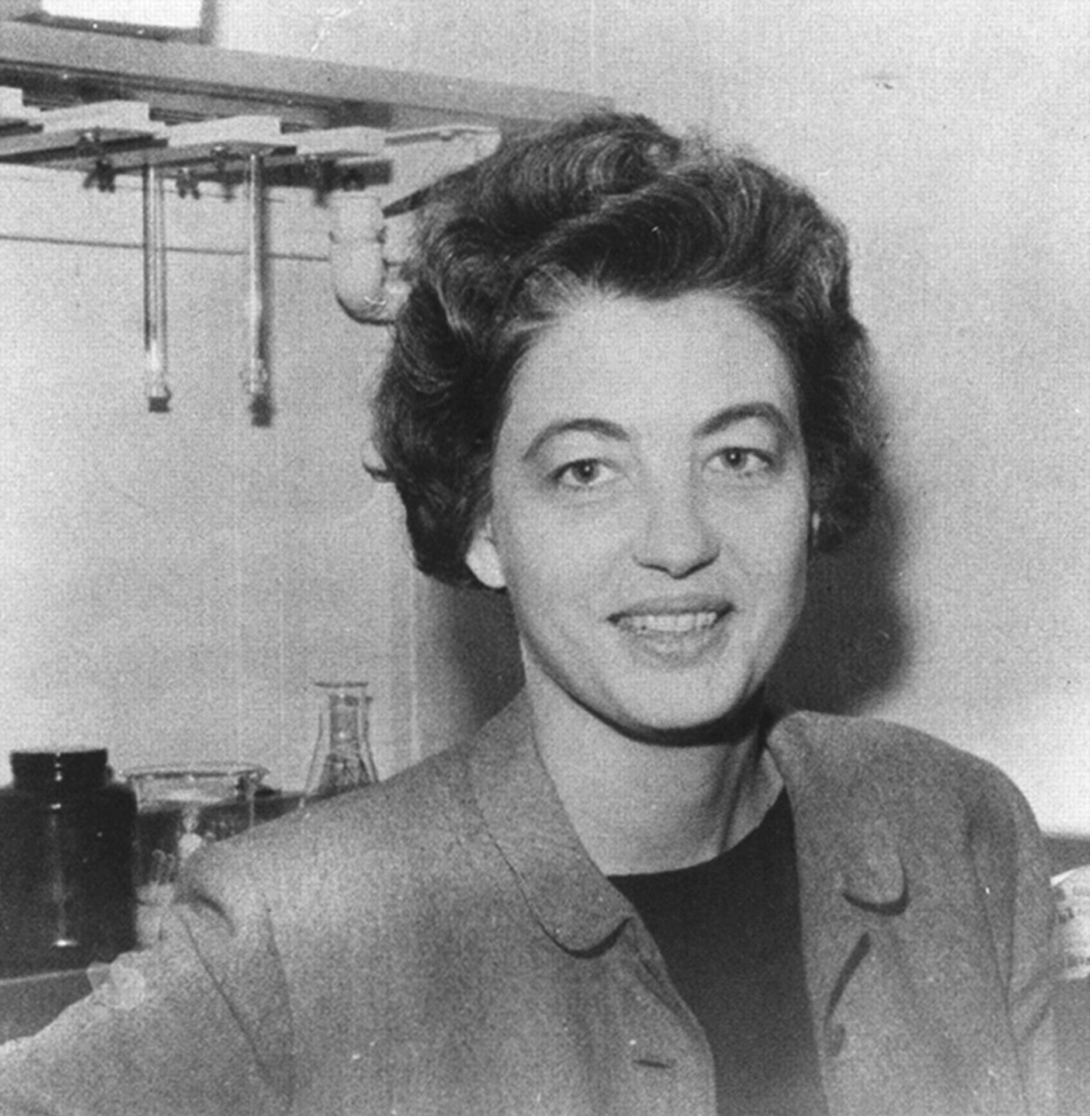
- Betty Hay in her new laboratory at Harvard Medical School in 1960
- Born: April 2, 1927; Melbourne, Florida, U.S.
- Died: August 20, 2007 (aged 80); Wayland, Massachusetts, U.S.
- Citizenship: American
- Education: Smith College (BA); Johns Hopkins School of Medicine (MD)
- Known for: investigations on limb regeneration, the process of epithelial-mesenchymal transitions (EMT), and the role of the extracellular matrix (ECM) in cell differentiation
- Awards: election to the National Academy of Sciences; the Centennial Award (AAA); the E.B. Wilson Medal (American Society for Cell Biology); Excellence in Science Award (FASEB); and the Henry Gray Award (AAA)
- Scientific career
- Fields: Cell biology; developmental biology
- Workplaces: Anatomy department at Johns Hopkins, anatomy department at Cornell Medical College, professorship of embryology at Harvard Medical School, chair of the department of anatomy and cellular biology at Harvard Medical School, president of American Association of Anatomists(1981-1982), American Society for Cell Biology (1976-1977), and Society for Developmental Biology (1973-1974)
- Academic advisors: S. Meryl Rose

Elizabeth Dexter "Betty" Hay (April 2, 1927 – August 20, 2007) was an American cell and developmental biologist. She was best known for her research in limb regeneration, the role of the extracellular matrix (ECM) in cell differentiation, and epithelial-mesenchymal transitions (EMT). Hay led many research teams in discovering new findings in these related fields, which led her to obtain several high honors and awards for her work. Hay primarily worked with amphibians during her years of limb regeneration work and then moved onto avian epithelia for research on the ECM and EMT. Hay was thrilled by the introduction of transmission electron microscopy (TEM) during her lifetime, which aided her in many of her findings throughout her career. Moreover, Hay was a huge advocate of women in science during her lifetime.

== Early days and education ==
Betty Hay was born in Melbourne, Florida, on April 2, 1927, to Isaac and Lucille Elizabeth Hay. She lived with her parents, twin brother, and sister. When World War II began, her father, who was a practicing physician at the time, enlisted in the US Army Medical Corp. The family was sent to Biloxi, Mississippi. They were soon transferred to Fort Hays, Kansas, where the resided for six months before Lt. Col. Hay was deported to the Philippines. After her chaotic childhood filled with many moves and various schools, Hay attended Smith College for four years. In 1948, she graduated as summa cum laude obtaining her BA degree in Biological Sciences.

Throughout her life, Hay was always intrigued by animals. During her sophomore year at Smith College, she began research on amphibian limb regeneration with Professor S. Meryl Rose, who became Betty's mentor and close friend. Hay also worked with Rose during the summers at the Marine Biological Laboratory in Woods Hole. Betty's love for drawing pictures of slides and dissected animals are some of the experiences that cemented her aspiration to pursue a career in biology. Rose eventually convinced Hay to pursue an MD instead of a PhD degree, as he believed it would give Hay more opportunities in the future. She then went on to receive an MD degree from Johns Hopkins in 1952 and was one of only four women in the graduating class.

== Professional life ==
In 1953, on short year after graduating from Johns Hopkins, Hay joined the Hopkins Anatomy Department faculty and continued her work on amphibian regeneration and embryological processes. Soon after, Hay moved to New York City to work with electron microscopists at Cornell Medical College and the Rockefeller Institute. Next, she moved to Harvard with Don Fawcett, who was one of her colleagues while at Cornell. While at Harvard she moved on from studying salamanders to focus more on the embryonic chick cornea. Hay then accepted the Louise Foote Pfeiffer Professorship of Embryology in 1969. In 1971, Hay became editor-in-chief of Developmental Biology. She continued to succeed and was elected chairperson of Harvard's department of anatomy and cellular biology in 1975. She served in this department for 18 years. Hay retired from the cell biology department of Harvard Medical School in 2005.

== Research ==
Hay is best known for her research in limb regeneration, the process of epithelial-mesenchymal transitions (EMT) during development, and the role of the extracellular matrix (ECM) in cell differentiation. When beginning her research career with Rose, their focus was on the induction of limb regeneration in animals that were not able to regenerate their limbs. They worked on tracing the origin of the cells in regenerating blastema. By transmission electron microscopy (TEM) they showed that the blastema that formed on the amputated surface of the amphibian limb contained uniform undifferentiated cells. These cells lost all remnants of their myofibrils or any other sign of previous differentiation. Hay was able to show the stages of myofibril loss by differentiated muscle cells using TEM. She confirmed that the limb tissues gave rise to undifferentiated blastema cells. Through this research, Hay came to the final conclusion that the differentiated somatic cells of the amphibian limb preserved enough developmental strength to fully regenerate a perfect limb. In other words, the regeneration of the limb is achieved when differentiated cells begin to dedifferentiate and become stem cells.

In 1957, Don Fischman started as a medical student at Cornell and immediately joined Betty's laboratory due to his undergraduate experience of working with amphibian limb regeneration. They traced the blastema cells with titrated thymidine and discovered that the epidermis did not enter the blastema. The blastema was the formed internal tissues, not the reserve cells or the epidermis, that gave rise to the regenerating limb. Their autoradiography observations on regenerating limbs also proved that mononuclear blood cells are the source of osteoclasts. When looking at the limbs, they could only obtain labeled nuclei from the monocytes. Therefore, Hay specifically labeled the blood and exhibited that the osteoclasts came from the blood cells.

In 1965, Hay met Jim Dobson, who was a scientist that was very good at culturing and growing up epithelium. Hay needed his help in order to prove that the epidermis produced collagen, which was an idea that she and Jean-Paul Revel originally postulated. They used avian corneal epithelium rather than salamander epidermis in order to provide more examples of epithelium secreting collagen. They produced a monograph of their findings, which was published in 1969. Steve Meier joined soon after, and in about 1974, their lab was becoming known for promoting the new idea that the ECM interacted with cells. They cultured corneal epithelium in all types of ECM and were able to show that the ECM can induce cell differentiation and that it directly interacts with cells in the embryo and adult. In 1972, Jonathan Bard came to spend a postdoctoral year in the Hay lab, working on two projects. The first was on corneal endothelium morphogenesis and they, with Sam Meller, showed that the key constraint on migration was space. The second was using Nomarski optics to study how corneal fibroblasts migrated through the stroma in vivo and in collagen gels (a technique developed by JB and Tom Elsdale in Scotland). This work showed that contact inhibition of movement occurred in vivo and in 3D gels.

Gary Greenburg then entered Betty' lab as a graduate student, and they started working with 48-hour chick embryos. They were able to see epithelia transform into mesenchyme when they were suspended in collagen gels. Jim Fitchett also entered the lab at about the same time. He worked with Hay using TEM to prove that EMT removed the palatal seam that forms when the opposite shelves fuse. Furthermore, their studies of the signaling pathways involved in EMT during development led to the discovery that Smads can activate these pathways in the embryo, instead of β-catenin.

Many colleagues and fellow scientists claim that Betty's greatest scientific contribution was revealing the role of extracellular matrix in regulating cell behavior, which led to the birth of a new field of cell and developmental biology. Hay believed that knowledge of the ECM was essential in order to understand other subjects including the cytoskeleton, cell migration, cell shape, and the control of cell growth and differentiation. She asserted that the basis of many scientific ideas originate from the full understanding the ECM's composition, relationship to the cell surface, and role in development. In all, Betty's passion for science, dedication to her work, and love for teaching others have all contributed to the legacy she has left.

== Awards and honors ==
Betty's work on revealing the role of ECM in regulating cell behavior led to her receiving over twenty national and internal awards. Some of these included the Centennial Award and the Henry Gray Award from the American Association of Anatomists, the FASEB Excellence in Science Award, the E.B. Wilson Medal from the American Society for Cell Biology, and the Edwin G. Conklin Medal from the Society for Developmental Biology. During this time, Hay served as the President of the American Society for Cell Biology, the Society for Development Biology, and the American Association of Anatomists. She was elected to the National Academy of Sciences in 1984.

== Hay Professorship ==
In the year 1975, Dr. Hay was established as the first female full-time professor to lead the Harvard Medical School preclinical department. With Hay's gift honoring her parents, the Isaac Morris and Lucille Elizabeth Hay Professorship in Embryology was established at the Johns Hopkins University in 2009. Peter N. Devreotes is the current holder of this academic rank.

== Personal life ==
Betty's immense dedicated and passion in her research caused her to always put her research career before her personal life. This led her to move around a lot by herself and leave many good friends behind. She was always more focused on her work than her relationships. Hay dated many men throughout her life, but she claimed that the men of her time were "merely looking for home-makers". Hay never married or had any children. Towards the end of her life she resided in Weston, Massachusetts with many cats. Hay died of lung cancer on August 20, 2007, in hospice in Wayland, Massachusetts.
