= Sir William Dunn Professor of Biochemistry =

The Sir William Dunn Professorship of Biochemistry is the senior professorship in biochemistry at the University of Cambridge. The position was established in 1914 by the trustees of the will of Sir William Dunn, banker, merchant and philanthropist.

The first holder of the chair was Frederick Gowland Hopkins, winner of the 1929 Nobel Prize in Medicine for his work on the discovery of vitamins.

== Sir William Dunn Professors ==
- Frederick Gowland Hopkins (1914-1943)
- Albert Chibnall (1943-1949)
- Frank George Young (1949-1975)
- Hans Kornberg (1975-1995)
- Tom Blundell (1995-2009)
- Gerard Evan (2009-2022)
- Laura Machesky (2022- )
