= Márta Korbonits =

Hungarian physician

- Born: Budapest; Hungary
- Education: Barts and The London School of Medicine and Dentistry
- Scientific career
- Workplaces: Barts and The London School of Medicine and Dentistry; Queen Mary University of London
- Thesis: Different aspects of the neuroregulation of the growth hormone axis (2001)

Márta Korbonits is a Hungarian physician, Professor of Endocrinology and deputy director of the William Harvey Research Institute at the Queen Mary University of London. She is an internationally recognised expert in pituitary tumorigenesis. She was elected President of the Society for Endocrinology and awarded the Endocrine Society's Laureate Award in 2023.

== Early life and education ==
Korbonits studied medicine and completed her early training in Budapest. She was first introduced to endocrinology during her fourth year of medical school, where she was inspired by Edit Gláz. She moved to the United Kingdom for her specialist training, and joined Barts and The London School of Medicine and Dentistry. At Barts her medical doctorate looked at the growth of secretagogues on hypothalamic hormone release. She also completed a doctorate, which considered the mechanisms that underpin pituitary tumorigenesis. During her Medical Research Council Clinician Science Fellowship she started investigated ghrelin physiology and genetics. Her demonstration of AMPK regulation by ghrelin helped people better understand hormonal regulation of metabolism.

== Research and career ==
Korbonits has dedicated her career to translational medicine: using clinical questions to design research experiments and using the outcomes of medical research for new diagnostics and treatment. She has focussed on understanding the mechanisms that underpin familial pituitary adenomas and tumorigenesis. She discovered the genetic link for the AIP ("Irish Giant") gene.

Alongside her research, Korbonits is a clinician who cares for patients with endocrine diseases.

== Awards and honours ==
- 2015 Endocrine Society Delbert A. Fisher Research Scholar Award
- 2022 European Neuroendocrine Association Rolf Gaillard Prize
- 2023 Endocrine Society Laureate Award
- 2023 Elected President of the Endocrine Society

== Select publications ==
- Sharmilee Gnanapavan; Blerina Kola; Stephen Bustin; et al. (1 June 2002). "The tissue distribution of the mRNA of ghrelin and subtypes of its receptor, GHS-R, in humans". The Journal of Clinical Endocrinology and Metabolism. 87 (6): 2988. doi:10.1210/jcem.87.6.8739. ISSN 0021-972X. PMID 12050285. Wikidata Q50336243.
- Ida Pernicova; Márta Korbonits (7 January 2014). "Metformin--mode of action and clinical implications for diabetes and cancer". Nature Reviews Endocrinology. 10 (3): 143–156. doi:10.1038/nrendo.2013.256. ISSN 1759-5029. PMID 24393785. Wikidata Q34658712.
- Erika Hubina; Miklós Góth; Márta Korbonits (1 June 2005). "Ghrelin--a hormone with multiple functions". Orvosi Hetilap. 146 (25): 1345–1351. ISSN 0030-6002. PMID 16106757. Wikidata Q81076366.
