= Christopher Wathes =

British research scientist

Christopher Michael Wathes OBE (May 1952 – 6 May 2016) was an English research scientist who specialised in agricultural and veterinary science.

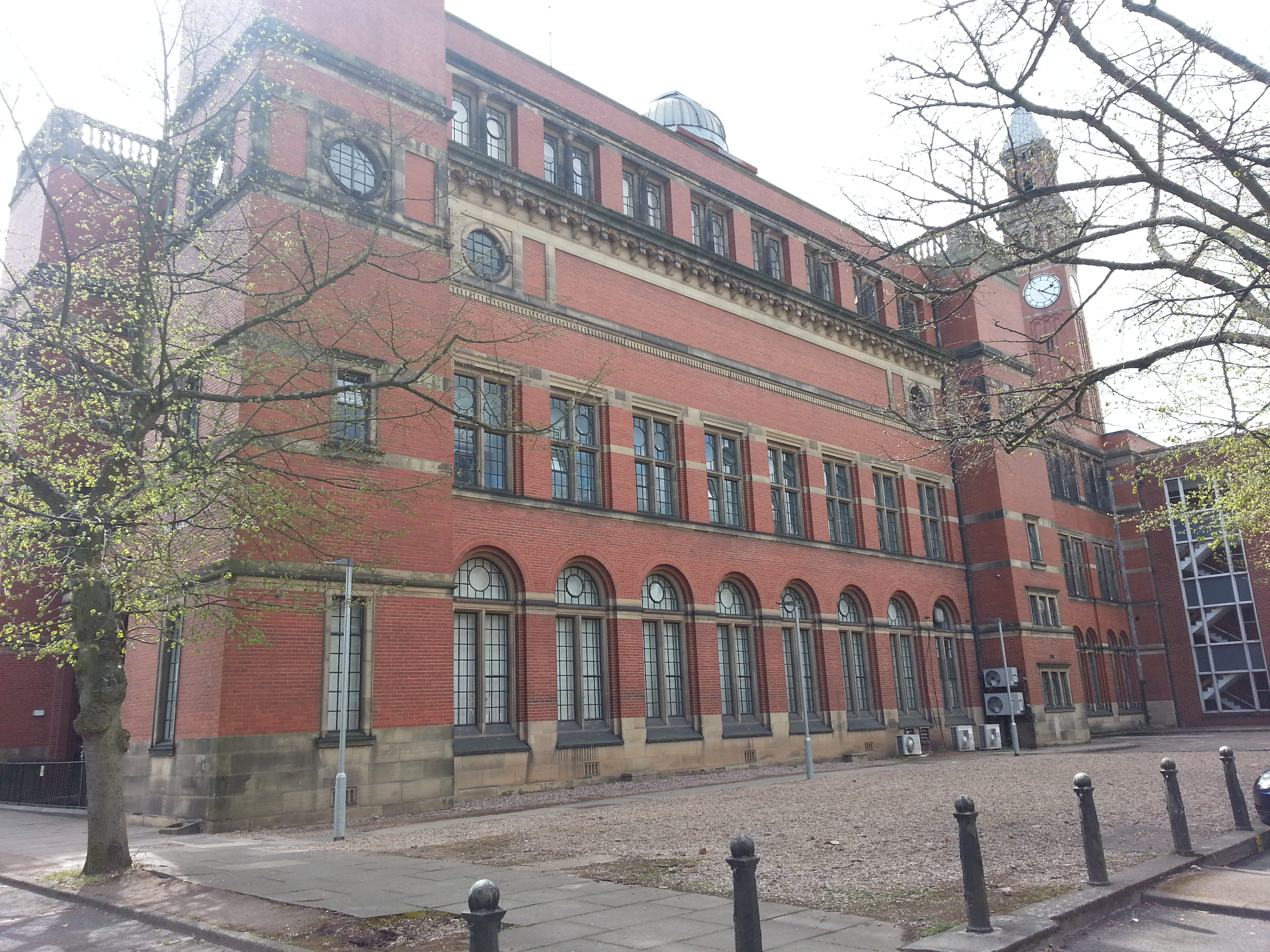
Birmingham University

Wathes was born in Birmingham in 1951 and graduated from the University of Birmingham with a BSc degree in physics in 1974. He graduated from the University of Nottingham in 1978 with a PhD in environmental physics.

From 2005 to 2013 Wathes was chairman of the Farm Animal Welfare Council, which advised the Department for Environment, Food and Rural Affairs (Defra) on the welfare of farmed animals. Wathes has been Professor of Animal Welfare and director of the Centre for Animal Welfare at the Royal Veterinary College, University of London since 2005. Previously he was Director of Science at the Biotechnology and Biological Sciences Research Council’s Silsoe Research Institute. In 2005 he was a member of Defra's Review of Avian Quarantine at the time of the outbreak of avian influenza.

Wathes was appointed an Officer of the Order of the British Empire in the 2013 Birthday Honours for services to animal welfare. He was awarded the Research Medal of the Royal Agricultural Society of England for research on environmental management for livestock in 2002. The medal recognises research work of outstanding merit, carried out in the United Kingdom of benefit to agriculture. He was an Elected Fellow of the Institution of Agricultural Engineers. In 2001 Wathes was guest professor at Huazhong Agricultural University in China. He was posthumously awarded the Universities Federation for Animal Welfare (UFAW) Medal for Outstanding Contributions to Animal Welfare Science in 2016.

He was married to Claire Wathes, also a veterinary researcher.
