= Laura Machesky =

American cancer research scientist

Laura Marie Machesky FRSE FMedSci (born 13 August 1965) is a British-American cancer research scientist. She is the Sir William Dunn Professor of Biochemistry in the Department of Biochemistry, University of Cambridge, and the current president of the British Society for Cell Biology.

== Early life and education ==
Machesky was born on 13 August 1965 in Dearborn, Michigan, United States. She studied at Alma College, graduating with a Bachelor of Science (BSc) degree in 1987, and then at Johns Hopkins University School of Medicine where she completed her Doctor of Philosophy (PhD) degree in 1993.

== Career ==
Machesky was a postdoc at the MRC Laboratory of Molecular Biology (LMB) from 1995 to 1997 and then an MRC Career Development Fellow, MRC Senior Research Fellow and Professor of Cell Biology at the School of Biosciences, University of Birmingham from 1998 to 2007. She was a Medical Research Council (MRC) senior research fellow and Professor of Cell Biology at the Beatson Institute for Cancer Research in Glasgow from 2007 to 2022, and director of the Institute of Cancer Sciences at the University of Glasgow from 2020 to 2022. She moved to Cambridge University in 2022 as Sir William Dunn Professor of Biochemistry.

== Research interests ==
Machesky's research group specialises in cancer cell migration, invasion, metastasis and the energetics of cell biology. She discovered the 7-subunit Arp2/3 complex and showed that this was a major regulator of actin dynamics and cell migration. According to the Academy of Medical Sciences, this work "changed the way the field understood fundamental principles of signalling to actin dynamics and impacted on biomedical problems such as host-pathogen interactions, endocytic trafficking, phagocytosis and cancer cell invasion".

== Awards and honours ==
Machesky was elected as a Member of the European Molecular Biology Organisation in 2012, a Fellow of the Royal Society of Edinburgh in 2014, and a Fellow of the Academy of Medical Sciences in 2016. Her husband Robert Insall is also a Fellow of the Royal Society of Edinburgh and is currently Professor of Computational Biology at University College London.
