= Journal of Endocrinology =

- Discipline: Endocrinology
- Language: English
- Edited by: Martin Haluzík, Ruth Andrew

Publication details
- History: 1939-present
- Publisher: Bioscientifica on behalf of the Society for Endocrinology
- Frequency: Monthly
- Impact factor: 3.9 (2024)

Standard abbreviations
- ISO 4: J. Endocrinol.

Indexing
- CODEN: JOENAK
- ISSN: 0022-0795 (print); 1479-6805 (web)
- LCCN: 64005925
- OCLC no.: 01754564

Links
- Journal homepage; Online access; Online archive

The Journal of Endocrinology is a monthly peer-reviewed scientific journal that publishes original research articles, reviews, and commentaries. Its focus is on endocrine physiology and metabolism, including hormone secretion, hormone action, and biological effects. The journal considers basic and translational studies at the organ and whole organism level.

The journal is published by Bioscientifica on behalf of the Society for Endocrinology. It is also an official journal of the Endocrine Society of Australia. The co-editors-in-chief are Martin Haluzík (Charles University) and Ruth Andrew (University of Edinburgh).

== History ==
The journal was conceived by Charles Dodds (the founding editor-in-chief), Frank Young, Alan Parkes, and Solly Zuckerman in 1937. The first issue was published in 1939 (it took two years to process the papers from draft manuscript to print) and contained 45 research articles. By 1946, five volumes had been published.

In February 1946, 22 previous contributors unanimously resolved to form the Society for Endocrinology and invited all previous authors to be founding members. Editorial board member Alan Parkes was elected as the society's first chairman.

From 1946, the number of issues that the journal published gradually increased. From 1953 to 1960 there were between five and seven issues each year, and from 1961 to 1965 there were eight to nine issues. Since 1966, the journal has been published monthly. The technological explosion of the 1970s and 1980s, exemplified by the development of recombinant DNA techniques, DNA sequencing, and the invention of PCR, resulted in an increase in research output in the areas of molecular and genetic endocrinology. In response to this, a sister journal entitled Journal of Molecular Endocrinology was established in 1988.

In 2014, the journal was adopted as an official journal of the Endocrine Society of Australia.

The regular use of molecular biology methods in work published in the journal, as well as its molecular-focused sister journal, often resulted in a blurred line between the subject areas covered. Consequently, in 2011 it was decided by the Publications Committee of the Society for Endocrinology that the two journals would have a single joint editorial board. This came into being at the start of 2012. While papers would still be submitted to one or the other of the journals, the senior editors would have the opportunity to suggest that manuscripts be transferred between publications.

== Editors-in-chief ==
The following people are or have been editor-in-chief:

- 1975–1980: Bernard Donovan
- 1981–1984: Alf Cowie
- 1985–1992: Gavin Vinson
- 1993–1999: Alan McNeilly
- 2000–2004: Steve Hillier
- 2005–2008: Julian Davis
- 2009–2015: Adrian Clark
- 2015–2019: Sofianos Andrikopoulos
- 2018–2024: Colin Farquharson
- 2019–present: Martin Haluzík
- 2024–present: Ruth Andrew

== Online access ==
The journal was first published online in September 1997 in PDF format. From October 2004, the online offering was extended to include the HTML full text version of articles. All peer-reviewed editorial and review content is free to access from publication. For the first 12 months, research articles are accessible for those at subscribing institutions and members of the Society for Endocrinology and the European Society of Endocrinology before being made available to the public for free (delayed open access). In addition, the journal offers a gold open access option (hybrid open access).

== Abstracting and indexing ==
The journal is abstracted and indexed in:

- Academic Search Premier
- BIOSIS Previews
- CAB Abstracts
- Chemical Abstracts Service
- Current Contents/Life Sciences
- Embase
- Index Medicus/MEDLINE/PubMed
- Science Citation Index Expanded

According to the Journal Citation Reports, the journal has a 2024 impact factor of 3.9.
