= European Society of Endocrinology =

European Society of Endocrinology (ESE)
- Formation: 1948 (Committee of the Acta Endocrinologica Countries); 1987 (European Federation of Endocrine Societies); 2006 (ESE)
- Type: Membership organisation
- Legal status: Registered Charity No. 1123492
- Headquarters: Starling House, 1600 Bristol Parkway North, Bristol, BS34 8YU, UK
- Website: www.ese-hormones.org

The European Society of Endocrinology (ESE) is a scientific society to promote for the public benefit research, education and clinical practice in endocrinology by the organisation of conferences, training courses and publications, by raising public awareness, liaison with national and international legislators.

== Major activities ==
Major activities include the organisation of the annual European Congress of Endocrinology. ESE also organises postgraduate courses at least biannually. ESE has three official journals: Endocrine Connections and Endocrinology, Diabetes & Metabolism Case Reports, which are published by Bioscientifica, and the European Journal of Endocrinology, which is published by Oxford University Press.

== Governing body ==
The overall governing body of ESE is the General Council, which comprises all ordinary members, affiliated societies and corporate members. The voting members of the General Council are electing the Executive Committee which shall manage the business of the Society and may exercise all the powers of the Society.

== Membership ==
Ordinary membership is open to researchers, clinicians and students in the field of endocrinology and hormonal systems. Affiliated societies membership is open to national endocrine societies and sub-specialist endocrine societies in Europe. Corporate membership is open to companies working in the field of endocrinology. Honorary membership is for persons of special distinction in endocrinology or who have performed outstanding service to the Society.

== History ==
An early predecessor organisation of the ESE was the Committee of the Acta Endocrinologica Countries (CAEC), which founded Acta Endocrinologica (Copenhagen), later renamed European Journal of Endocrinology, in June 1948. It also organised the Acta Endocrinologica Congresses, the first of which took place in Copenhagen, Denmark, on 22–25 August 1954. This series of congresses gave way to the first European Congress of Endocrinology in 1987, when the European Federation of Endocrine Societies (EFES), an umbrella organisation of national societies for endocrinology in Europe, was founded. On this basis, the ESE was officially launched on January 1, 2006, following a consultation process with EFES member organisations.

== Affiliated societies ==
Affiliated Society membership is open to national endocrine societies and pan-European sub-specialist endocrine societies in Europe.

Pan-European sub-specialist endocrine societies

- Alexandria Thyroid Association
- Arabic Association for the Study of Diabetes and Metabolism
- European Academy of Andrology
- European Biological Rhythms Society
- European Calcified Tissue Society
- European Menopause and Andropause Society
- European Network for the Study of Adrenal Tumors
- European Neuroendocrine Association
- European Neuroendocrine Tumour Society
- European Pituitary Pathology Group
- European Society for Paediatric Endocrinology
- European Society of Gynecology
- European Thyroid Association
- International Growth Hormone (IGF) Society
- The Growth Hormone Research Society
- Ukrainian Association for Pediatric Endocrinologists

National endocrine societies

- Albanian Society of Endocrinology and Diabetology
- Algerian Society of Endocrinology and Metabolism (SAEM)
- Association of Endocrinologists and Diabetologists of the Republic of Srpska
- Austrian Society for Endocrinology and Metabolism
- Azerbaijan Endocrinologists Society Public Union
- Belgian Endocrine Society
- Bosnia and Herzegovina Society of Endocrinology and Diabetology
- Bulgarian Society of Endocrinology
- Croatian Endocrine Society
- Croatian Society for Endocrinology and Diabetology
- Croatian Society for Diabetes and Metabolic Disorders
- Cyprus Endocrine Society
- Czech Endocrine Society
- Danish Endocrine Society
- Estonian Endocrine Society
- Finnish Endocrine Society
- French Endocrine Society
- Georgian Association of Endocrinology and Metabolism
- German Society for Endocrinology
- Hellenic Endocrine Society (Greece)
- Hungarian Society of Endocrinology and Metabolism
- Icelandic Endocrine Society
- Irish Endocrine Society
- Israel Endocrine Society
- Italian Association of Clinical Endocrinologists - Associazione Medici Endocrinologi (AME)
- Italian Endocrine Society - Societa Italiana Endocrinologia (SIE)
- Kosovo Association of Endocrinologists and Diabetologists
- Latvian Association of Endocrinologists
- Lebanese Society of Endocrinology, Diabetes and Lipids
- Lithuanian Society for Endocrinology
- Macedonian Scientific Association of Endocrinologists and Diabetologists
- Society of Endocrinologists from Republic of Moldova
- The Endocrinology Association of Montenegro
- Netherlands Society for Endocrinology (NVE)
- Norwegian Society of Endocrinology
- Polish Society of Endocrinology
- Polish Society of Gynecological Endocrinology
- Portuguese Society of Endocrinology, Diabetes and Metabolism
- Romanian Psychoneuroendocrine Society
- Romanian Society of Endocrinology
- Serbian Endocrine Society
- Slovak Endocrine Society
- Slovenian Endocrine Society
- Society for Endocrinology, UK
- Spanish Society of Endocrinology and Nutrition
- Swedish Endocrine Society
- Swiss Society of Endocrinology and Diabetes
- Tunisian Society of Endocrinology
- Society of Endocrinology and Metabolism of Turkey
- Ukraine Diabetology Association
- Association of Endocrinologists of Ukraine
