= Hans Kornberg =

British-American biochemist (1928–2019)

Sir Hans Kornberg FRS
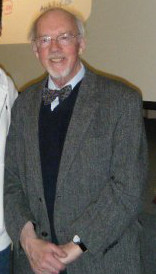
- Born: Hans Leo Kornberg; 14 January 1928; Herford, Province of Westphalia, Free State of Prussia, Germany
- Died: 16 December 2019 (aged 91); Boston, Massachusetts, U.S.
- Citizenship: United Kingdom
- Education: University of Sheffield
- Relatives: Susanna Cork (granddaughter); Benedict Cork (grandson)
- Awards: Colworth Medal (1963)
- Scientific career
- Fields: Biochemistry
- Workplaces: Boston University; University of Leicester; University of Cambridge; University of Sheffield; University of Oxford

Sir Hans Leo Kornberg, FRS (14 January 1928 – 16 December 2019) was a British-American biochemist. He was Sir William Dunn Professor of Biochemistry in the University of Cambridge from 1975 to 1995, and Master of Christ's College, Cambridge from 1982 to 1995.

== Early life and education ==
Kornberg was born in 1928 in Germany to Jewish parents, Max Kornberg (1889–1943) and Margarete (née Silberbach, 1890-1928), who died three weeks after his birth. In 1939, his father and stepmother Selma (née Nathan; 1886–1943) got him out of Nazi Germany (though they could not follow), first to an uncle in Amsterdam and eventually to the care of an uncle in Yorkshire. A few years later, his father and stepmother were murdered in the Holocaust. Initially he went to a school for German refugees, but later to Queen Elizabeth Grammar School in Wakefield.

On leaving school he became a junior laboratory technician for Hans Adolf Krebs at the University of Sheffield who encouraged him to study further and apply for a scholarship at the same university. He graduated with a BSc Honours in Chemistry in 1949. His interest moved to biochemistry and he studied in the Faculty of Medicine, receiving a PhD degree in 1953 on the studies on urease in mammalian gastric mucosa.

== Career ==
After receiving Commonwealth Fund Fellowship and working for two years in Yale University and Public Health Research Institute in USA, he then returned to the UK where his mentor, Sir Hans Krebs, had moved to Oxford University and offered him a post there. This partnership produced a paper in Nature, concerning their discovery of the glyoxylate cycle, and also a joint book entitled Energy Transformations in Living Matter in 1957.

In 1960, he was appointed to the first Chair in Biochemistry at the University of Leicester, which he held until 1975. Later, he was elected as Sir William Dunn Chair of Biochemistry at the University of Cambridge. Hans became a lecturer at Worcester College between 1958 and 1961, and was also the first person to receive The Biochemical Society's annual Colworth Medal on 1963.

He received Christ's Fellowship in 1975 and was elected as the 34th Master of the Christ's College, Cambridge from 1982 to 1995. In 1995, he retired to take up a position as a Professor of Biology at Boston University, USA, where he taught biochemistry.

== Honours and awards ==
He was elected to the Fellowship of the Royal Society in 1965 and the same year awarded the Colworth Medal of The Biochemical Society. In 1973, he was awarded the Otto Warburg Medal of the German Society for Biochemistry and Molecular Biology. In the 1978 Queen's Birthday Honours List he was knighted for "services to science". He has been awarded 11 honorary doctorates and has been elected into membership of:

- The United States National Academy of Sciences
- The German Academy of Sciences "Leopoldina"
- The Italian National Academy of Sciences "Lincei"
- The American Philosophical Society
- The American Academy of Arts and Sciences
- The American Society of Biological Chemistry and Molecular Biology
- The Japanese Biochemical Society
- Phi Beta Kappa Society

and Honorary Fellowship of

- The Biochemical Society (UK)
- The Royal Society of Biology
- Brasenose College (Oxford)
- Worcester College (Oxford)
- Wolfson College (Cambridge)
- The Foulkes Foundation (London)

== Personal life ==
While at Oxford, he met and married his first wife, Monica King, in 1956 and had four children: Julia, Rachel, Jonathan and Simon. The children were raised Catholic. Monica died in 1989. In 1991, he married a Jewish woman, Donna Haber. Sir Hans Kornberg died on 16 December 2019.

Academic offices
| Preceded by New position | Professor of Biochemistry, University of Leicester; 1960–1975 | Succeeded by Bill Brammar |
| Preceded by Frank George Young | Sir William Dunn Professor of Biochemistry, Cambridge University; 1975–1995 | Succeeded by Tom Blundell |
| Preceded by Jack Plumb | Master of Christ's College, Cambridge; 1982–1995 | Succeeded by Alan Munro |
