= Wiebke Arlt =

German endocrinologist

Wiebke Arlt is a German endocrinologist. She is Director of the MRC London Institute of Medical Sciences and Head of the Institute of Clinical Sciences at Imperial College London. She is also Honorary Professor at the University of Birmingham. She specialises in adrenal disease and disorders of sex development.

== Career ==
Arlt studied medicine at the University of Cologne, completing a MBChB in 1990 and an academic MD in 1993. She trained in endocrinology at Universitätsklinikum Würzburg (University Hospital Würzburg) and finished her training in 1998. She then embarked on a research career, beginning in the University of California in San Francisco (UCSF) under the supervision of pediatric endocrinologist Walter L. Miller, with a fellowship grant from the German Research Council. She returned to Würzburg as a consultant endocrinologist briefly in 2001, before moving to the University of Birmingham in England in 2002 with another fellowship from the German Research Council. She became a senior lecturer at the university in 2004, the same year that she received a Medical Research Council clinical fellowship. She was promoted to Head of the Centre for Endocrinology, Diabetes and Metabolism in 2008 and William Withering Chair of Medicine in 2014. She is also director of Birmingham's Institute of Metabolism and Systems Research (ISMR), and is an honorary consultant endocrinologist at the Queen Elizabeth Hospital Birmingham, where she specialises in adrenal and gonadal disease.

She became a Fellow of the Royal College of Physicians in 2006 and was elected to the Academy of Medical Sciences in 2010.

== Research ==
Arlt's main research interests involve adrenal tumours and disorders of sex development. Her group at the University of Birmingham conducted the first randomised controlled trial to show that DHEA replacement is beneficial in patients with adrenal insufficiency. She has also discovered a form of androgen excess due to a single gene mutation. At UCSF, Arlt and Walter Miller described a new form of congenital adrenal hyperplasia. She has authored more than 200 publications and is editor-in-chief of the European Journal of Endocrinology.
