= Endocrine Connections =

- Discipline: Endocrinology
- Language: English
- Edited by: Faisal Ahmed

Publication details
- History: 2012–present
- Publisher: Bioscientifica on behalf of the European Society of Endocrinology and the Society for Endocrinology (United Kingdom)
- Frequency: Monthly
- Open access: Yes
- Impact factor: 2.6 (2023)

Standard abbreviations
- ISO 4: Endocr. Connect.

Indexing
- ISSN: 2049-3614 (print); 2049-3614 (web)

Links
- Journal homepage; Current Issue; All Issues

Endocrine Connections is a society-owned, monthly peer-reviewed open-access scientific journal. It covers endocrinology with a focus on basic, clinical, and translational research and reviews in all areas of endocrinology, including papers that deal with non-classical tissues as source or targets of hormones and papers that have relevance to endocrine-related and intersecting disciplines and the wider biomedical community. It is jointly owned by the European Society of Endocrinology and the Society for Endocrinology. According to the Journal Citation Reports, the journal has a 2022 impact factor of 2.9. The journal has been published by Bioscientifica since 2012.

== History ==
The journal was established in June 2012 as a joint venture between the European Society of Endocrinology and the Society for Endocrinology, to be published by Bioscientifica and to service the endocrine community as one of the first fully open-access endocrine journals.

The founding editor-in-chief was Jens Sandahl Christiansen (Aarhus University). As of 2024, the current editor-in-chief is Syed Faisal Ahmed.

== Online access ==
All peer-reviewed editorial and review content is free to access from publication. As the journal is fully open-access, all published articles are released under the 'gold' open access option, whereby authors pay an article processing charge upon acceptance to have their article made freely available online immediately upon publication. These articles are automatically deposited into PubMed Central.

The journal's licence policy includes CC BY, CC BY-NC, and CC BY-NC-ND.

== Abstracting and indexing ==
The journal is abstracted and indexed in:

- Directory of Open Access Journals
- Science Citation Index Expanded
