= Laurence Pearl =

British biologist

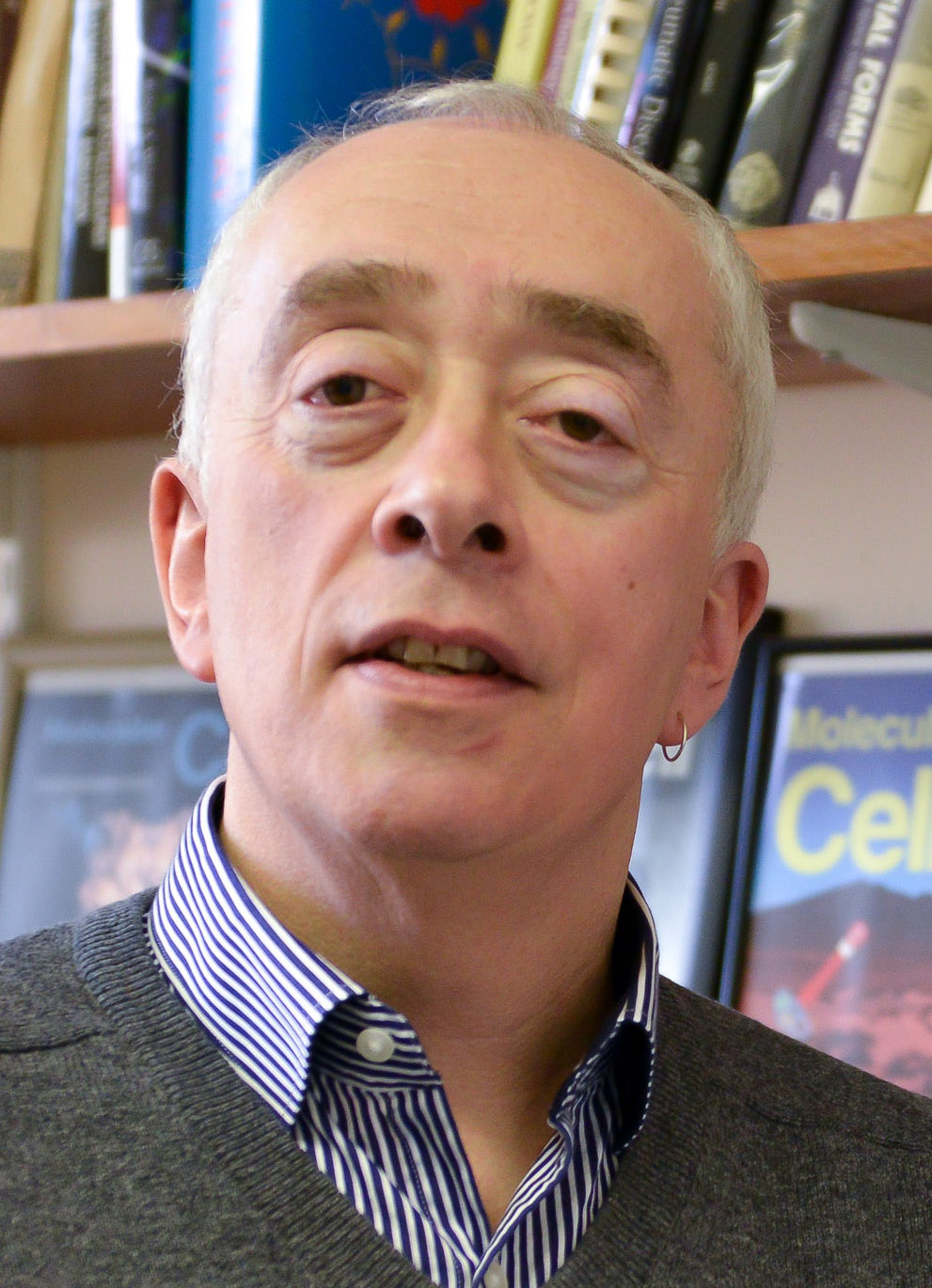
- Laurence Pearl in his office
- Born: Laurence Harris Pearl; 18 June 1956 (age 70); Manchester, England
- Education: University College London; Birkbeck College
- Occupation: biochemistry
- Known for: Work on HIV-1 protease, DNA repair Enzymes, Hsp90 and GSK-3
- Spouse: Frances M. G. Pearl
- Children: two sons, one daughter
- Awards: FRS (2008); FMedSci (2007); EMBO member; MAE (2012); Novartis Medal of the Biochemical Society (2017)
- Scientific career
- Fields: Drug discovery; Structural Biology; Biophysics; DNA repair; Genome evolution; Genome instability; Proteins; Biochemistry
- Workplaces: University College London; University of Sussex; Institute of Cancer Research
- Thesis: Crystallographic studies of endothiapepsin (1984)
- Doctoral advisor: Tom Blundell
- Website: sussex.ac.uk/profiles/243849

Laurence Harris Pearl (born 18 June 1956) is a British biochemist and structural biologist who is currently Professor of Structural Biology in the Genome Damage and Stability Centre and was Head of the School of Life Sciences at the University of Sussex.

== Education ==
Born in Manchester to a working class Jewish family, he went to Manchester Grammar School where he was very active in school drama productions, appearing alongside Nicholas Hytner in The Government Inspector. Pearl read Biochemistry at University College London and then obtained MSc and PhD degrees in the Department of Crystallography at Birkbeck College, for studies of endothiapepsin under the supervision of Tom Blundell. He was part of the Birkbeck College University Challenge team who were semi-finalists in 1984, and achieved the 2nd highest score in the show's history - 430 against Exeter College, Oxford.

== Career ==
Following Postdoctoral research positions at Birkbeck College and the Institute of Cancer Research in Sutton, Surrey, he returned to UCL as lecturer in Biochemistry in 1989, becoming Reader and then Professor of Structural Biology in 1996. In 1999 he rejoined the Institute of Cancer Research to chair the new Section of Structural Biology (jointly with David Barford) at the Chester Beatty Laboratories in Chelsea.

In 2009 he was appointed Head of the new School of Life Sciences at the University of Sussex, relocating his laboratory to the MRC Genome Damage and Stability Centre, where he holds the position of Professor of Structural Biology.

In 2017 he announced that he would be standing down as Head of the School of Life Sciences at Sussex.

From October 2017 until June 2026 he held a joint appointment as Head of the Division of Structural Biology at the Institute of Cancer Research while continuing as Professor of Structural Biology in the Genome Damage and Stability Centre at the University of Sussex.

== Research and enterprise ==
His research focuses on understanding the structural basis for assembly, specificity and regulation of proteins and complexes involved in human diseases such as HIV/AIDS and cancer. He is particularly noted for his early work on the HIV-1 protease, proteins involved in DNA repair such as uracil-DNA glycosylase and DNA-PKcs and the Hsp90 molecular chaperone system. Although focussed on understanding basic mechanisms, his laboratory is committed to translating this understanding to the discovery of new drugs for patient benefit.

He is a founder and CSO of Domainex Ltd, an innovative biotech company that won the 2010 Life Sciences and Enterprise Programme of The Year Award, and the "Innovation in Enabling Biotechnology" Prize at 2007 UKTI Bioentrepreneurial Company of the Year Awards.

On arrival at Sussex he undertook the restructuring of the School of Life Sciences which resulted in nearly one third of the faculty accepting early retirement or leaving the university, and rationalised the degree programs, stopping a number of poorly-recruiting Masters programmes. Sussex now ranks 8th in the UK in Biosciences in the 2012 Guardian University Guide, and Chemistry, which had been threatened with closure in 2006, has been revitalised with the appointment of new Faculty in Organic and Synthetic Chemistry, and with the launch of a university-funded initiative in Medicinal Chemistry and Drug Discovery.

Sussex ranked 10th overall in the UK for Biological Sciences, and 8th for research outputs in the 2014 Research Excellence Framework (REF), placing it on par with Cambridge and ahead of the majority of Russell Group Universities.

== Awards and honours ==
Pearl was elected to membership of the European Molecular Biology Organisation (EMBO) in 2005, a Fellow of the Academy of Medical Sciences (FMedSci) in 2007, a Fellow of the Royal Society (FRS) in 2008 and a Member of the Academia Europaea (MAE) in 2012. In 2011 he was awarded an inaugural Senior Investigator Award by the Wellcome Trust. His nomination for the Royal Society reads

Laurence Pearl has applied structural, biochemical and genetic techniques, to elucidate the molecular basis of function and specificity in systems of fundamental biomedical importance. His pioneering work on retroviral proteases was a key step in the recognition of HIV protease as a therapeutic target in AIDS. He has made seminal contributions to our understanding of the recognition and repair of DNA damage. In studies of the molecular chaperone Hsp90, he was the first to show its function depended on binding and hydrolysis of ATP, and he defined the mechanism of the ATPase-coupled molecular clamp that drives the chaperone cycle. In his research on cell signalling he has determined the structure of GSK-3-beta, showing how it recognises substates, and elucidating how it is inhibited through insulin signalling.

Pearl and his research team were awarded the 2013 Cancer Research UK Translational Cancer Research Prize along with the team of Paul Workman at the Institute of Cancer Research for their seminal work in developing the Hsp90 molecular chaperone as a new target for cancer therapy and for their role in development of the drug AUY922.

Laurence Pearl was awarded the 2018 Novartis Medal and Prize from the Biochemical Society for his significant contributions to our understanding of the biochemical and structural basis for assembly, specificity and regulation of the proteins and complexes that carry out DNA repair and DNA damage signalling, signal transduction, and chaperone-dependent protein activation.
