= Charlotte Deane =

Professor of Structural Bioinformatics

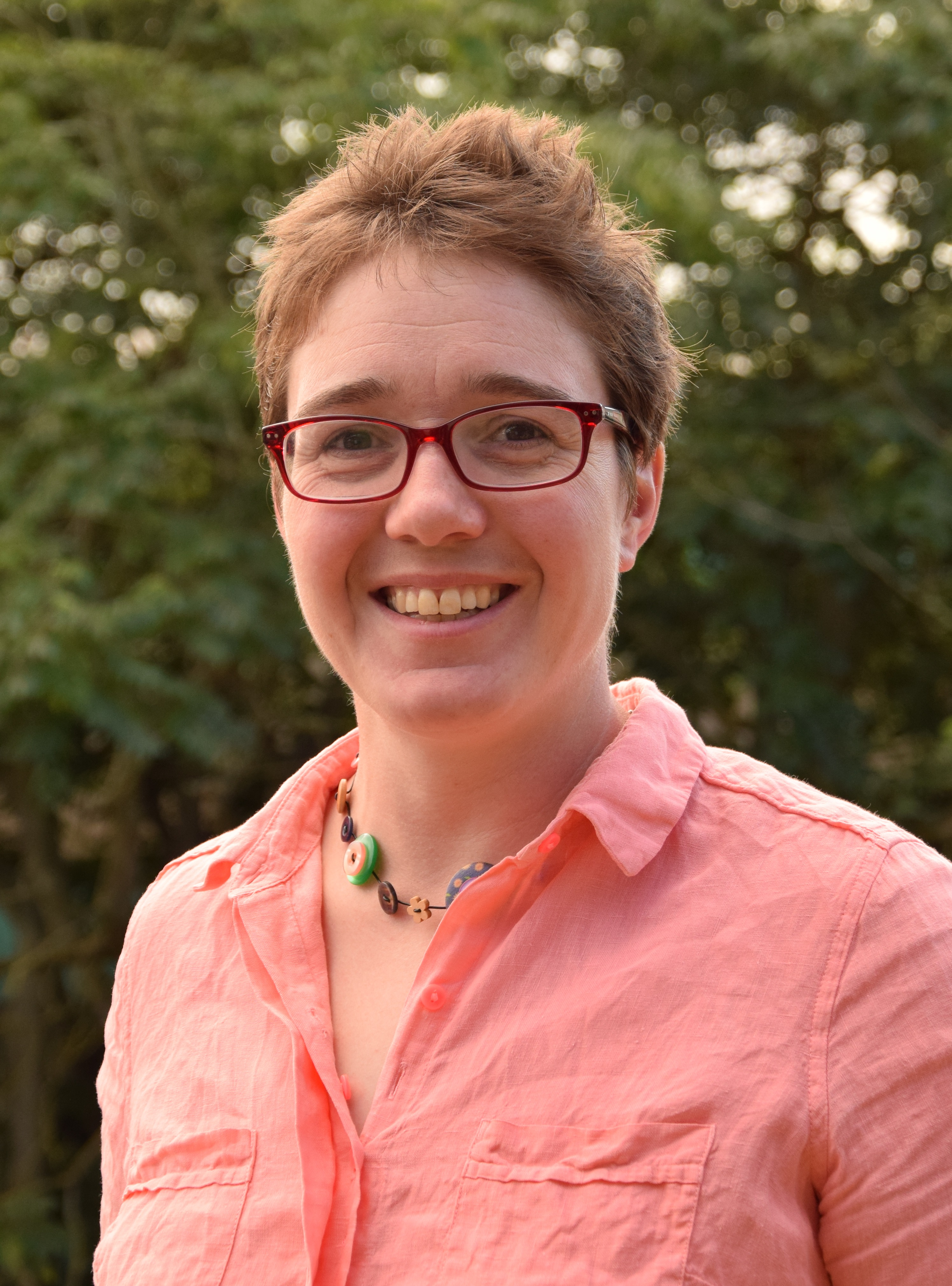
- Born: 6 May 1975
- Education: University College, Oxford; University of Cambridge
- Employers: University of California, Los Angeles; University of Oxford
- Awards: Fellow of the Royal Society (2026)
- Scientific career
- Fields: Structural biology, bioinformatics
- Workplaces: University of California, Los Angeles; University of Oxford
- Thesis: Protein structure prediction: amino acid propensities and comparative modelling
- Doctoral advisor: Tom Blundell
- Academic advisors: Graham Richards, David Eisenberg
- Website: www.stats.ox.ac.uk/~deane/

Charlotte Mary Deane MBE FRS (born 1975) is an English Professor of Structural Bioinformatics and the former Head of the Department of Statistics at the University of Oxford. Deane was appointed as Executive Chair of the Engineering and Physical Sciences Research Council (EPSRC) on 16 November 2023. Deane was elected a Fellow of the Royal Society in May 2026.

== Early life and education ==
Charlotte Deane was born in May 1975. She completed her undergraduate education at University College, Oxford studying chemistry, obtaining a 2.1 degree and completing her final year project in Graham Richards' group. She then went to the University of Cambridge to study structural bioinformatics supervised by Tom Blundell. In 2000 she published her thesis entitled "Protein structure prediction: amino acid propensities and comparative modelling".

== Career and research ==
Deane moved to UCLA where she stayed for two years, supervised by David Eisenberg, as a Wellcome Trust Research Fellow, before returning to Oxford.

Her research is on protein structure prediction, particularly antibodies. Her research group, Oxford Protein Informatics Group (OPIG), created a database of antibody structures called SABDab and a server for prediction of antibody structures called SAbPred.

Deane also researches immunoinformatics, biological networks and small molecules.

== Honours and awards ==
In 2007 and 2008, Deane was awarded an Oxford Teaching Award. In 2002 she was elected as fellow of Kellogg College and University Lecturer. In 2010 she was elected as Professor of Structural Bioinformatics and in October 2015 she was appointed Head of the Department of Statistics at the University of Oxford. She is the first female Head of department since the department was created in 1988.

In 2014, Deane became Associate Head of the Mathematical Physical and Life Sciences (MPLS) division and the Deputy Head of the Division in 2018.

Deane became a fellow of St Anne's College in 2015.

In September 2019, Deane was appointed Deputy Executive Chair of the Engineering and Physical Sciences Research Council (EPSRC).

As of January 2022, Deane joined Exscientia as Chief Scientist of Biologics AI.

She was appointed Member of the Order of the British Empire (MBE) in the 2022 Birthday Honours for services to Covid-19 research.

Deane was elected as a fellow of the International Society for Computational Biology in 2025.

Deane was elected to the Fellowship of the Royal Society in May 2026.

Academic offices
Preceded by Geoffrey Nicholls	Director of the University of Oxford Department of Statistics; 2015–present	Incumbent
