= Endocrine-Related Cancer =

- Discipline: Oncology, endocrinology
- Language: English
- Edited by: Matthew Ringel

Publication details
- Former name: Reviews on Endocrine-Related Cancer
- History: 1994-present
- Publisher: Bioscientifica on behalf of the Society for Endocrinology
- Frequency: Monthly
- Impact factor: 4.6 (2024)

Standard abbreviations
- ISO 4: Endocr.-Relat. Cancer

Indexing
- CODEN: ERCAE9
- ISSN: 1351-0088 (print); 1479-6821 (web)
- OCLC no.: 40802577

Links
- Journal homepage; Online access; Online archive

Endocrine-Related Cancer is a monthly peer-reviewed medical journal covering cancers in endocrine organs — such as the breast, prostate, pituitary, testes, ovaries, and neuroendocrine system — and hormone-dependent cancers occurring elsewhere in the body. Its scope covers basic, translational, clinical and experimental studies.

The journal is published by Bioscientifica on behalf of the Society for Endocrinology. It is also an official journal of the North American Neuroendocrine Tumor Society, the Endocrine Society of Australia and the Japanese Hormone and Cancer Society. The editor-in-chief is Matthew Ringel MD, PhD (Ralph W. Kurtz Professor of Medicine, and Director of the Division of Endocrinology and Metabolism at The Ohio State University, USA) and, according to the ISI Journal Citation Reports, the journal has a 2024 impact factor of 4.6.

== History ==
Endocrine-Related Cancer was founded as Reviews on Endocrine-Related Cancer, the in-house journal of Zeneca (now AstraZeneca) published by its parent company ICI Pharmaceuticals. It was taken over by the Society for Endocrinology in 1994 when it was renamed, and the remit was extended to include a limited number of original research articles to complement the existing reviews. The numbers of research articles gradually increased over time.

The editor-in-chief of the journal at the time of the name change and remit extension was Vivian H.T. James, who took the journal's precursor and set Endocrine-Related Cancer on a firm footing for development and expansion. Marc Lippman took over leadership in 2000 and managed the fourfold increase in published pages. He also oversaw an impact factor increase from 0.933 in 1999 to 4.597 in 2004.

In 2006, Endocrine-Related Cancer was adopted as an official journal by the European Society of Endocrinology, in 2015 by the Japan Hormone and Cancer Society and in 2021 by the Endocrine Society of Australia. James Fagin held the role of editor-in-chief from 2006 to 2010. During this time the impact factor rose to 5.236.

There were four annual issues of the journal from 1994 to 2010. From 2011 to 2015 Endocrine-Related Cancer was published bimonthly and, as of 2017, is published monthly.

== Online access ==
Endocrine-Related Cancer was first published online in March 1998 in PDF format. From September 2004, the online offering was extended to include the HTML full text version of articles and separate figures.

All peer-reviewed editorial and review content is free to access from publication. Research articles are under access control for the first 12 months before being made available to the public. During the first 12 months the content is accessible for those at subscribing institutions and members of the Society for Endocrinology and the European Society of Endocrinology.

The journal automatically deposits articles to PubMed Central on behalf of authors who are funded by the National Institutes of Health (NIH), for release 12 months from publication, enabling authors to comply with the NIH Public Access Policy.

Endocrine-Related Cancer is a hybrid open access journal, offering a 'gold' open access option whereby authors can pay an article publishing charge upon acceptance to have their article made freely available online immediately upon publication. These articles are automatically deposited into PubMed Central.

All journal content is included in the World Health Organization's HINARI scheme, which offers free or reduced-price access for institutions in certain developing countries to health-related research.

The archive of published content from 1994 to 1997 is available to purchase by institutions as part of the Society for Endocrinology Archive.

== Abstracting and indexing ==
Endocrine-Related Cancer is abstracted and indexed in:

- CAB Abstracts
- Chemical Abstracts
- Current Contents (Clinical Medicine)
- EMBASE/Excerpta Medica
- Index Medicus/MEDLINE/PubMed
- Biosis
- Science Citation Index
- Academic Search Premier
