= Chibal =

Chibal may refer to:

- Chibhal, a region and a former princely state in Kashmir
- Chi Bal, a village and commune in Srey Santhor District, Cambodia
- Chibal, a descent group among the Maya
