= Reproduction (journal) =

- Discipline: Reproductive medicine
- Language: English
- Edited by: Christopher Price, Karen Schindler

Publication details
- Former name(s): Journal of Reproduction and Fertility, Reviews of Reproduction
- History: 1960–present
- Publisher: Bioscientifica on behalf of the Society for Reproduction and Fertility
- Frequency: Monthly
- Open access: Delayed, after 12 months, hybrid
- Impact factor: 3.7 (2023)

Standard abbreviations
- ISO 4: Reproduction

Indexing
- CODEN: RCUKBS
- ISSN: 1470-1626 (print); 1741-7899 (web)
- LCCN: 2001245725
- OCLC no.: 45662873
- Journal of Reproduction and Fertility
- ISSN: 0022-4251
- Reviews of Reproduction
- ISSN: 1359-6004

Links
- Journal homepage; Online access; Online archive

Reproduction is a monthly peer-reviewed medical journal covering the cellular and molecular biology of reproduction, including the development of gametes and early embryos in all species; developmental processes such as cell differentiation, morphogenesis and related regulatory mechanisms in normal and disease models, assisted reproductive technologies in model systems and in a clinical environment, and reproductive endocrinology, immunology and physiology. Emerging topics including cloning, the biology of embryonic stem cells, environmental effects on reproductive potential and health, and epigenetic effects on reproductive and developmental processes are also covered. All editorial and review content is free to access from publication; research articles become available after 12 months.

It is an official journal of the Society for Reproduction and Fertility and is published on their behalf by Bioscientifica. The editors-in-chief are Christopher A Price (Université de Montréal) and Karen Schindler (Rutgers, The State University of New Jersey).

== History ==
The journal was established in 1960 as the official journal of the Society for Reproduction and Fertility under the name Journal of Reproduction and Fertility. The founding editor-in-chief was Colin Russell Austin. The journal obtained its current name in 2001 when it was merged with Reviews of Reproduction, a journal that was published by the Society for Reproduction and Fertility from 1996 to 2000.

For the first two years the journal was published quarterly. This increased from six (1962–1967) to nine (1968–1970) to 12 (1971–1975) annual issues. In 1976, publication frequency reduced back down to six issues a year until 2000, since which time the journal has been published monthly.

=== Editors-in-chief ===
The following persons have been editors-in-chief:

- Colin Russell Austin (University of Cambridge): 1960–1964
- Sir Alan Parkes (University of Cambridge): 1965–1968
- Denis Bartlett (JRF Ltd, Cambridge): 1968–1976
- Emmanuel Ciprian Amoroso (ARC, Babraham): 1973–1975
- Barbara Weir (JRF Ltd, Cambridge): 1976–1991
- Brian Cook (University of Glasgow): 1992–1993
- Colin Finn (University of Liverpool): 1993–1998
- Robert Webb (University of Nottingham): 1999–2003
- John Carroll (University College London): 2004–2007
- Tom Fleming (University of Southampton): 2008–2012
- Kevin Sinclair (University of Nottingham): 2013–2017

== Abstracting and indexing ==
The journal is abstracted and indexed in:

- Biological Abstracts
- BIOSIS Previews
- CAB Abstracts
- Chemical Abstracts Service
- Current Contents/Life Sciences
- Embase
- Index Medicus/MEDLINE/PubMed
- Science Citation Index
- Scopus
- The Zoological Record

According to the Journal Citation Reports, the journal has a 2020 impact factor of 3.906.
