= Marjorie Chibnall =

English historian and medievalist (1915–2012)

Marjorie Chibnall OBE FBA
- Born: Marjorie McCallum Morgan; 27 September 1915; Atcham, Shropshire, England
- Died: 23 June 2012 (aged 96); Sheffield, England
- Education: University of Oxford
- Spouse: Albert Chibnall
- Scientific career
- Fields: Medieval history
- Workplaces: Clare Hall, University of Cambridge, Girton College, Cambridge, University of Aberdeen
- Thesis: The English priories and manors of the abbey of Bec-Hellouin (1942)
- Doctoral advisor: Eileen Power
- Other academic advisors: William Abel Pantin

Marjorie McCallum Chibnall (27 September 1915 – 23 June 2012) was an English historian, medievalist and Latin translator. She edited the Historia Ecclesiastica by Orderic Vitalis, with whom she shared the same birthplace of Atcham in Shropshire.

== Biography ==
Born into a farming family at Preston near Atcham in Shropshire in 1915, although baptised at St Lucia's Church, Upton Magna, Chibnall was educated at Shrewsbury Priory County Girls' School and Lady Margaret Hall, Oxford, where she was taught by Evelyn Jamison, V. H. Galbraith and F. M. Powicke.

In 1947, she married the biochemist and amateur medieval historian Albert Chibnall, who died in 1988. They had a son and a daughter. She died in Sheffield on 23 June 2012, at the age of 96.

== Scholarly life ==
Marjorie Chibnall took her BLitt at the University of Cambridge on the subject of ecclesiastical law, before moving on for her doctorate to a study of the relations between the mighty Bec Abbey in Normandy and its dependent English priories. She completed her doctorate in 1939 under the supervision of the economic historian Eileen Power. Her early career was spent teaching at the University of Southampton (1941–1943) and the University of Aberdeen (1943–1947).

Chibnall was from 1947 a lecturer in history at Girton College, Cambridge, and from 1953 a fellow of the college, but she relinquished her positions there in 1965 in order to complete her editorial work on the Historia Ecclesiastica of Orderic Vitalis. Four years later she was made a research fellow and subsequently a fellow of Clare Hall, Cambridge, and an honorary fellow of Girton College.

In a career spanning more than six decades, Marjorie Chibnall worked extensively on Anglo-Norman and Norman history. She encouraged much scholarship on these topics, as an active participant at the Battle Conferences on Anglo-Norman history and an editor of their proceedings. Chibnall's editions of the writings of Orderic Vitalis were acclaimed works, as was her biography of the Empress Matilda. She continued to publish when she was well into her nineties. Her last book, a short account of the Normans, was published in 2000. She also edited five volumes of Anglo-Norman Studies, the proceedings of the annual Battle Conference on Anglo-Norman Studies.

== Honours ==
Chibnall was elected a Fellow of the British Academy in 1978. In 1979, the University of Birmingham granted her an honorary doctorate. In 2004, she was awarded an OBE for services to history.

The Battle Conference on Anglo-Norman Studies established the Marjorie Chibnall Essay Prize. It is awarded to doctoral students or those within two years of completing their PhD for an unpublished paper to be presented at the conference and published in its proceedings.

== Select bibliography ==
- Select Documents of the English lands of the Abbey of Bec, (Royal Historical Society, Camden Third Series vol. 73, 1951)
- John of Salisbury's Memoirs of the Papal Court, (London, 1956)
- (ed. & tr) The Ecclesiastical History of Orderic Vitalis, 6 vols., (Oxford, 1969–1980)
- Charters and Custumals of the Abbey of Holy Trinity, Caen (Oxford, 1982)
- The World of Orderic Vitalis, (Oxford, 1984)
- Anglo-Norman England 1066–1166, (Oxford, 1986)
- Editor and translator: The Historia Pontificalis of John of Salisbury, (Oxford, 1986)
- Empress Matilda, (Oxford, 1991)
- (ed. with Leslie Watkiss) The Waltham Chronicle : An Account of the Discovery of Our Holy Cross at Montacute and its Conveyance to Waltham (Oxford, 1994)
- (Editor and translator with R. H. C. Davis): The Gesta Guillelmi of William of Poitiers, (Oxford, 1998)
- The Debate on the Norman Conquest, (Manchester, 1999)
- Piety, Power and History in Medieval England and Normandy, (Aldershot, 2000)
- The Normans (Oxford, 2000)
