= Samuel Barnett Schryver =

British biochemist

Samuel Barnett Schryver FRS
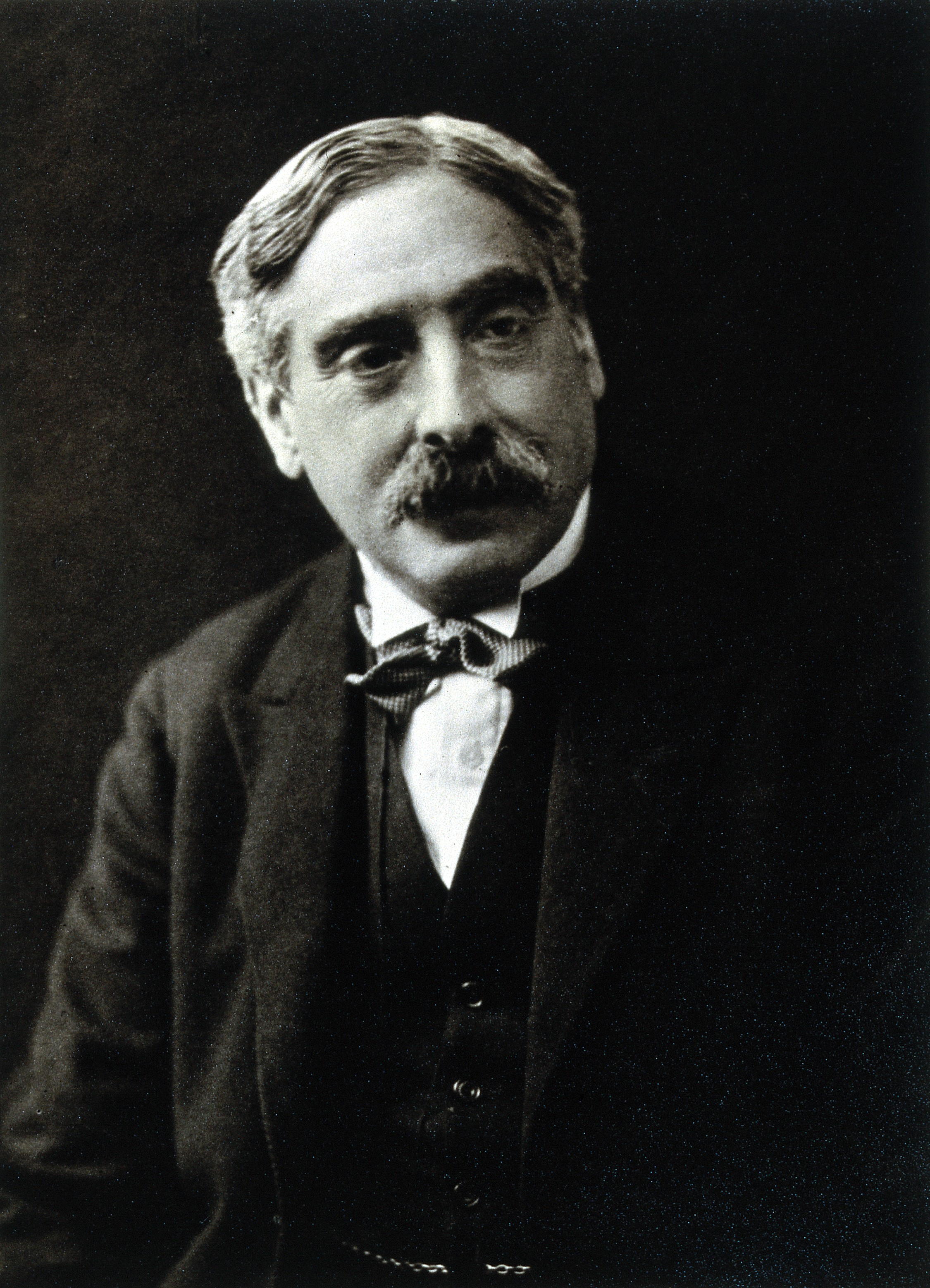
- Born: 15 March 1869; London, United Kingdom
- Died: 21 August 1929 (aged 60)
- Education: University of Leipzig
- Spouse: Elsie Naomi Davis (m. 1910)
- Scientific career
- Fields: Biochemistry
- Workplaces: University College London; Institute of Cancer Research; Imperial College of Science

Samuel Barnett Schryver FRS (15 March 1869 – 21 August 1929) was a British biochemist. Among other subjects, his work studied autolysis of tumours, gastric juice in diseases of the stomach, and coagulation.

== Biography ==
Samuel Barnett Schryver was born in London to Jewish parents Lewis and Elisabeth Schryver. He was educated at the University College School, before going on to study at University College London, the Zurich Polytechnikum, and the University of Leipzig, graduating with a Ph.D. from the latter institution. He worked as Demonstrator in Chemistry at University College Liverpool from 1893 until 1897, and then as a researcher at the Wellcome Research Laboratories until March 1901, when he was appointed Lecturer in Physiological Chemistry at University College London.

In 1907 Schryver began working as a chemist at the Research Institute of the Cancer Hospital, and in 1913 joined the faculty of the Imperial College of Science, becoming full Professor in 1920. He was elected a Fellow of the Royal Society in 1928.

He was married to Elsie Naomi Davis, sister of poet Nina Salaman.

He is buried at Willesden Jewish Cemetery, London.

== Bibliography ==
Besides nearly a hundred scientific papers and notes, Schryver published the following books:

- Chemistry of the Albumens. Ten lectures delivered in the Michaelmas term, 1904, in the Physiological Department of University College, London. Philadelphia: P. Blakiston's Son & Co. 1906. hdl:2027/coo1.ark:/13960/t08w3zr57.
- The General Characters of the Proteins. Monographs on Biochemistry. London: Longmans, Green and Co. 1909.
- An Introduction to the Study of Biological Chemistry. London: T. C. and E. C. Jack. 1919. hdl:2027/uc2.ark:/13960/t0rr1qn4q.
