= Gerard Evan =

British biologist

- Born: 17 August 1955 (age 71)
- Education: St Peter's College, Oxford; King's College, Cambridge
- Known for: Disease Models & Mechanisms
- Awards: Fellow of the Royal Society (2004); FMedSci (1999); PhD (1982)
- Scientific career
- Fields: Cancer; Disease biology Myc regulator gene p53 tumour suppressor
- Workplaces: University of Oxford; University of Cambridge; UCSF; Cancer Research UK; Ensemble Therapeutics
- Thesis: Monoclonal antibodies as reagents for the analysis of cell surfaces (1982)
- Website: www.bioc.cam.ac.uk/uto/evan labmed.ucsf.edu/about/faculty/pathology-gevan.html

Gerard Ian Evan FRS, FMedSci (born 17 August 1955) is a British biologist and, since May 2022, Professor of Cancer Biology at King's College London and a principal group leader in the Francis Crick Institute. Prior to this he was Sir William Dunn Professor of Biochemistry and Head of Biochemistry at the University of Cambridge (2009–2022).

== Education ==
Evan was educated at St Peter's College, Oxford, where he studied Biochemistry, and King's College, Cambridge, where he was awarded his PhD in 1982 for research using Monoclonal antibodies.

== Research ==
Evan does research to the determine the molecular basis of cancer.

== Career ==
Prior to Cambridge, Evan was Royal Society Napier Professor at University College London and the Imperial Cancer Research Fund (1988–99), then Gerson & Barbara Bass Bakar Distinguished Professor of Cancer Biology, at University of California, San Francisco (1999–2011).

Academic offices
Preceded by	Professor of Cancer Biology at King's College London; 2020–present	Incumbent
