= Journal of Molecular Endocrinology =

- Discipline: Endocrinology
- Language: English
- Edited by: Martin Haluzík, Ruth Andrew

Publication details
- History: 1988-present
- Publisher: Bioscientifica on behalf of the Society for Endocrinology
- Frequency: 8/year
- Impact factor: 3.8 (2024)

Standard abbreviations
- ISO 4: J. Mol. Endocrinol.

Indexing
- CODEN: JMLEEI
- ISSN: 0952-5041 (print); 1479-6813 (web)
- OCLC no.: 848525322

Links
- Journal homepage; Online access; Online archive

The Journal of Molecular Endocrinology is a peer-reviewed scientific journal published eight times per year. Its focus is on molecular and cellular mechanisms in endocrinology, including gene regulation, cell biology, signalling, mutations, and transgenesis.

The journal is published by Bioscientifica on behalf of the Society for Endocrinology. It is also an official journal of the Endocrine Society of Australia. The co-editors-in-chief are Martin Haluzík (Charles University) and Ruth Andrew (University of Edinburgh).

== History ==
The journal was established in 1988 in response to the rapid increase in research output in the areas of molecular and genetic endocrinology that had occurred as a result of technological advancements of the 1970s and 1980s, such as the development of recombinant DNA techniques, DNA sequencing, and the invention of the polymerase chain reaction. The founding editor-in-chief was Barry L. Brown.

The journal was conceived by members of the Society for Endocrinology and the editorial board of the Journal of Endocrinology, as the existing publication's sister journal. The Journal of Molecular Endocrinology was initially offered free of charge to all its subscribers. In its first year there were three issues of the journal published. This increased to six issues each year from 1989 to 2015 and, as of 2017, there are eight annual issues.

In 2006, the journal was adopted as an official journal of the European Society of Endocrinology and in 2014 of the Endocrine Society of Australia.

The increasingly regular use of molecular biology methods in work published in Journal of Endocrinology often resulted in a blurred line between the subject areas covered by the journals. Consequently, in 2011 it was decided by the Publications Committee of the Society for Endocrinology that the two publications would have a single joint editorial board. This came into being in 2012. While papers would still be submitted to one or other of the journals, the senior editors would have the opportunity to suggest that manuscripts be transferred between them where appropriate.

== Online access ==
The journal was first published online in October 1997 in PDF format. From October 2004, the online offering was extended to include the HTML full text version of articles and separate figures.

All peer-reviewed editorial and review content is free to access from publication. Research articles are under access control for the first 12 months before being made available to the public. During the first 12 months the content is accessible for those at subscribing institutions and members of the Society for Endocrinology.

The journal is a hybrid open-access journal, offering a gold open access option whereby authors can pay an article publishing charge upon acceptance to have their article made freely available online immediately upon publication. These articles are automatically deposited into PubMed Central.

== Abstracting and indexing ==
The journal is abstracted and indexed in:

- Academic Search Premier
- Biosis
- CAB Abstracts
- Chemical Abstracts
- Current Contents/Life Sciences
- Embase
- Index Medicus/MEDLINE/PubMed
- Science Citation Index Expanded

According to the Journal Citation Reports, the journal has a 2024 impact factor of 3.8.
