= Bioscientifica =

British biomedical publishing company

- Formation: 1996
- Legal status: A company limited by guarantee and incorporated in England and Wales
- Purpose: Biomedical publishing, event management, and association management
- Headquarters: Starling House, 1600 Bristol Parkway North, Bristol, BS34 8YU, United Kingdom
- Managing Director: Kate Sargent
- Parent organization: Society for Endocrinology
- Website: http://www.bioscientifica.com/

Established in 1996, Bioscientifica Ltd is the commercial subsidiary of the Society for Endocrinology, and provides publishing, events, and association management services to biomedical societies, and to the pharmaceutical industry. Although the company generates profits, these are redistributed to Bioscientifica's partner societies to fund biomedical research and practice.

== Publishing ==
Bioscientifica publishes academic journals and case reports focused on endocrinology, and its intersecting disciplines. The company also publishes free-to-read conference abstracts via its BiosciAbstracts platform and conference proceedings via Bioscientifica Proceedings. According to the 2021 Journal Citation Reports, six of Bioscientifica's publications have an impact factor: Endocrine-Related Cancer, Journal of Endocrinology, Journal of Molecular Endocrinology, European Thyroid Journal, Reproduction, and Endocrine Connections.

Bioscientifica was an early proponent of open access. In February 2012, the company was among the first 24 publishers to sign the STM Association's Sustainable Open Access Statement. Bioscientifica currently publishes four open access journals, supports gold open access publication in its subscription journals, and makes all journal content free to read online 12 months after publication.

As part of its charitable remit, Bioscientifica participates in the HINARI programme, through which the publisher provides free access to its journals in developing countries.

== Event management ==
Bioscientifica manages academic conferences for biomedical societies. Their event services include:

- Scientific and social programme management
- Accommodation management
- Abstract management and publication
- Event marketing and press
- Conference websites and mobile apps
- Coordination of grants and awards
- Liaison with CPD accreditors
- Sponsorship and exhibition sales
- Budget management and bookkeeping

Several of the events managed by Bioscientifica have won industry awards. Recent awards include:

- 2019: Silver Award for 'Best Operations Team' at the 2019 Conference Awards
- 2018: Bronze Award for 'Best Conference by an event agency' at the 2018 Conference Awards
- 2015: 'Best Association Conference Outside London' at the Association Excellence Awards.
- 2013: 'Best Association Conference' prize at the fourth Annual Conference Awards

== Association management ==
Bioscientifica currently provides Association Management and secretariat services to the following societies:

- British Society for Paediatric Endocrinology and Diabetes
- Society for Endocrinology
- UK and Ireland Neuroendocrine Tumour Society

== Professional memberships ==
Bioscientifica is a member of the following professional bodies:

- Association of British Professional Conference Organisers
- Association of Learned and Professional Society Publishers
- Committee on Publication Ethics
- Independent Scholarly Publishers Group
- International Association of Scientific, Technical, and Medical Publishers

== Governance ==
Bioscientifica is governed by its board of directors, which is composed of Society for Endocrinology officers, industry professionals, and members of Bioscientifica's executive team. The board is currently made up of the following members.

- Chair: AJ van der Lelij
- Aled Rees
- Mark Gurnell
- Ian Bannerman
- Vicky Williams
- Kate Sargent
- David Mills
