= Frank Young (biochemist) =

Sir Frank George Young FRS
- Born: 25 March 1908; London
- Died: 20 September 1988 (aged 80)
- Education: Alleyn's School, Dulwich; University College, London
- Known for: Studies of diabetes
- Awards: FRS, 1949; Croonian Lecturer, 1962; Banting medal of the British Diabetic Association, 1948; Upjohn award of the Endocrine Society, USA, 1963; Knighted, 1973
- Scientific career
- Fields: Biochemistry
- Workplaces: University of Aberdeen; University of Toronto; St Thomas's Hospital, London; Cambridge University
- Academic advisors: J. N. Collie, Frederick G. Donnan, Jack Drummond, Charles Lovatt Evans, Archibald Hill
- Notable students: Philip Randle

Sir Frank George Young FRS (25 March 1908 – 20 September 1988) was a distinguished biochemist, noted for his work on diabetes, Sir William Dunn Professor of Biochemistry at Cambridge University, and the first Master of Darwin College, Cambridge.

== Early life ==
Young was born in London and educated at Alleyn's School, Dulwich and University College, London where he graduated in chemistry and physics in 1929. After graduating, he remained at UCL to do postgraduate research in the field of biochemistry.

== Career ==
As a research fellow Young studied diabetes at the University of Aberdeen and the University of Toronto. At the age of 34 he was awarded his first chair when appointed in 1942 as the Professor of Biochemistry at St Thomas's Hospital Medical School, University of London. Thereafter his advancement was rapid, becoming professor of biochemistry at UCL in 1945 and then, in 1949, being elected as the third Sir William Dunn Professor of Biochemistry at Cambridge University, a post he was to hold for the ensuing 26 years. His Cambridge appointment coincided with his election in March 1949 to Fellowship of the Royal Society.

At Cambridge, Young became a Fellow of Trinity Hall until in 1964 he was appointed as the first Master of the new Darwin College, a position he held until 1976. Doctoral students of Young's during his tenure at Cambridge include Sir Philip Randle.

Young served on numerous national and international bodies including the Medical Research Council (1950–1954), the Executive Council of the Ciba Foundation (1954–1977), the British Nutrition Foundation, of which he was a co-founder in 1967 and served as President from 1970 to 1976).

He also served on various government advisory bodies, including the Committee on Medical Aspects of Food Policy (1957–1980), the Advisory Committee on the Irradiation of Food, the Royal Commission on Medical Education (1965–1968), the Council of the International Union of Biochemistry (1961–1972) and the Executive Board of the International Council of Scientific Unions (1970–1974).

His interests in diabetes were reflected in his service as a Vice-President of the British Diabetic Association from 1948, President of the European Association for the Study of Diabetes from 1965 to 1968, and President of the International Diabetes Federation from 1970 to 1973.

He was knighted for his services to biochemistry in the 1973 New Year Honours.

Academic offices
Preceded by Albert Chibnall	Sir William Dunn Professor of Biochemistry, Cambridge University; 1949–1975	Succeeded by Hans Kornberg
Preceded by New position	Master of Darwin College, Cambridge; 1964–1970	Succeeded by Moses Finley
