= Society for Endocrinology =

- Formation: 1946
- Type: Membership organisation
- Legal status: A registered charity in England and Wales
- Headquarters: Starling House, 1600 Bristol Parkway North, Bristol, BS34 8YU, United Kingdom
- Key people: Kate Sargent, Chief Executive; Márta Korbonits, President
- Subsidiaries: Bioscientifica
- Website: www.endocrinology.org

The Society for Endocrinology is an international membership organisation and registered charity representing scientists, clinicians and nurses who work with hormones. The Society was established in 1946, and currently has approximately 3,000 members.

== Charitable aims and activities ==
The Society's aims are:

- To advance scientific and clinical education and research in endocrinology for the public benefit.
- To attract high quality scientists, doctors and nurses into endocrinology and support their professional development to advance science and medicine.
- To engage the public with endocrinology and its impact.
- To raise the profile and be the voice of endocrinology in the UK.
- To promote and support the global endocrine community through collaboration.

According to the Association of Medical Research charities, in 2015 the Society spent £1,605,456 on charitable activities, with £998,776 directly funding health research in the UK.

== History ==
The Society for Endocrinology was officially formed in 1946. John Folley FRS was elected as the Society's first Secretary, Cliff Emmens was elected Treasurer, and Lord Zuckerman was made Honorary Editor of the Society's Proceedings. Writing in the Journal of Endocrinology, Zuckerman explained that he actually conceived of creating a Society for Endocrinology with his colleagues, Sir Charles Dodds, Sir Frank Young, and Sir Alan Parkes as early as 1937, but the creation of the Society was postponed due to the outbreak of World War II.

In 1996, the Society established a commercial subsidiary, Bioscientifica, to raise funds for the Society by providing services to third parties.

== Publications ==
The Society for Endocrinology has the following official journals:

- Clinical Endocrinology
- Journal of Endocrinology
- Journal of Molecular Endocrinology
- Endocrinology, Diabetes & Metabolism Case Reports
- Endocrine Connections
- Endocrine Oncology
- Endocrine-Related Cancer
- Endocrine Abstracts.

The Society also publishes a quarterly magazine, The Endocrinologist.

== Events ==
The Society for Endocrinology organises a variety of conferences and training events. Its flagship event is the annual Society for Endocrinology BES conference, which draws an international delegation of scientists, clinicians, nurses and trainee endocrinologists.
