= 1-Fluoro-2,4-dinitrobenzene =

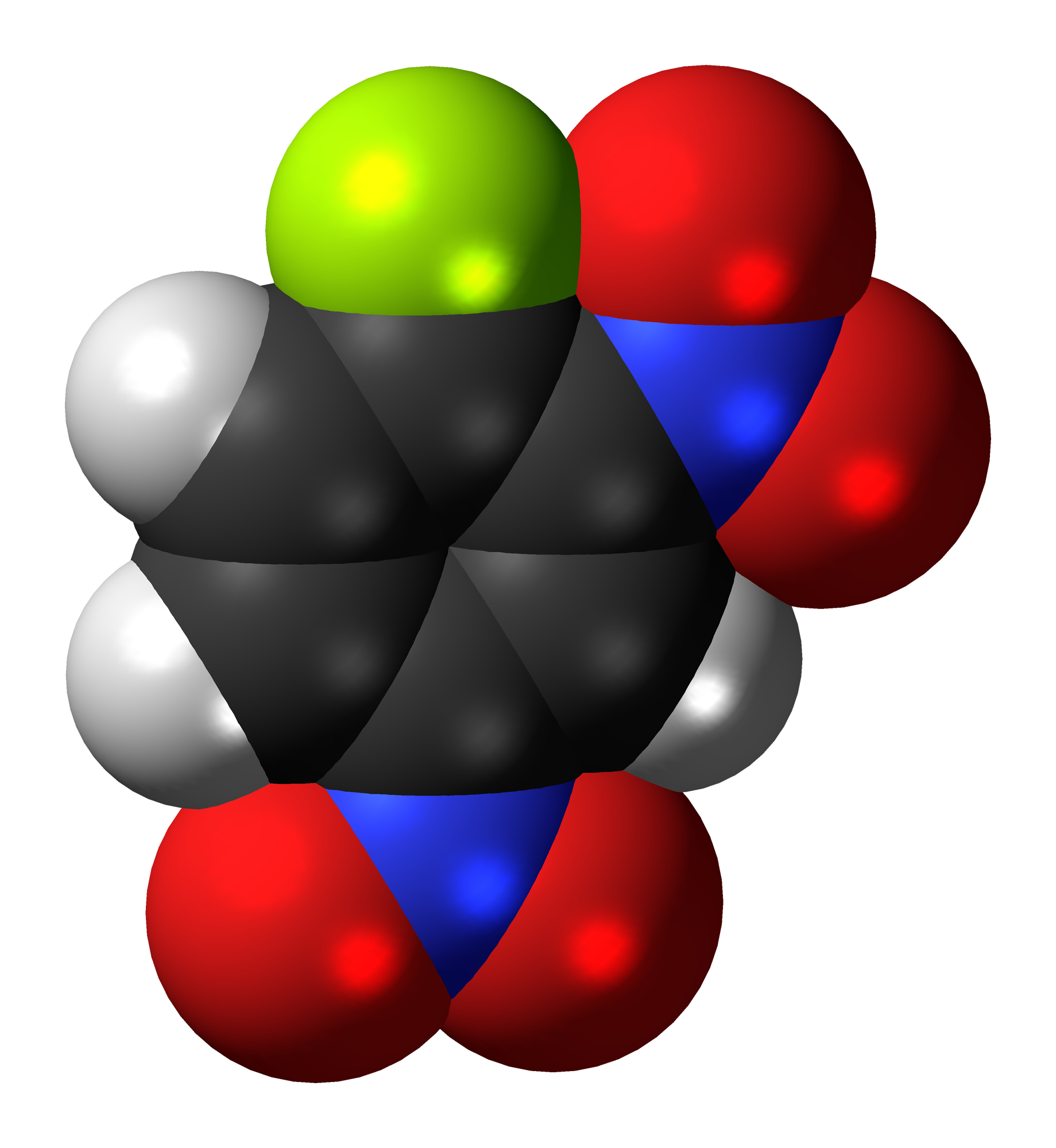

Names
- Preferred IUPAC name 1-Fluoro-2,4-dinitrobenzene
- Other names Dinitrofluorobenzene; Sanger's reagent

Identifiers
CAS Number	70-34-8
3D model (JSmol)	Interactive image
Abbreviations	DNFB, FDNB
ChEBI	CHEBI:53049
ChEMBL	ChEMBL167423
ChemSpider	21106037
ECHA InfoCard	100.000.668
PubChem CID	6264
UNII	D241E059U6
CompTox Dashboard (EPA)	DTXSID8025331
- InChI: InChI=1S/C6H3FN2O4/c7-5-2-1-4(8(10)11)3-6(5)9(12)13/h1-3H Key: LOTKRQAVGJMPNV-UHFFFAOYSA-N; InChI=1/C6H3FN2O4/c7-5-2-1-4(8(10)11)3-6(5)9(12)13/h1-3H Key: LOTKRQAVGJMPNV-UHFFFAOYAZ
- SMILES: O=[N+]([O-])c1cc(ccc1F)[N+]([O-])=O

Properties
Chemical formula	C_{6}H_{3}FN_{2}O_{4}
Molar mass	186.098 g·mol^{−1}
Appearance	yellow crystals
Density	1.4718 g·cm^{−3} (54 °C)
Melting point	25.8 °C (78.4 °F; 298.9 K)
Boiling point	296 °C (565 °F; 569 K)

Hazards
- GHS labelling
Pictograms	(GHS06: Toxic)
Hazard statements	H301, H311, H331, H340, H350
Precautionary statements	P260, P280, P282, P315
- Lethal dose or concentration (LD, LC)
LD_{50} (median dose)	50 mg/kg-1
LD_{Lo} (lowest published)	100 mg/kg-1
- Safety data sheet (SDS)
- Except where otherwise noted, data are given for materials in their standard state (at 25 °C [77 °F], 100 kPa). verify (what is ?) Infobox references

1-fluoro-2,4-dinitrobenzene (commonly called Sanger's reagent, dinitrofluorobenzene, DNFB or FDNB) is a chemical that reacts with the N-terminal amino acid of polypeptides. This can be helpful for sequencing proteins.

== Preparation ==
In 1936, Gottlieb presented a synthesis in which 1-chloro-2,4-dinitrobenzene reacted with potassium fluoride (KF) in nitrobenzene:

== Uses ==
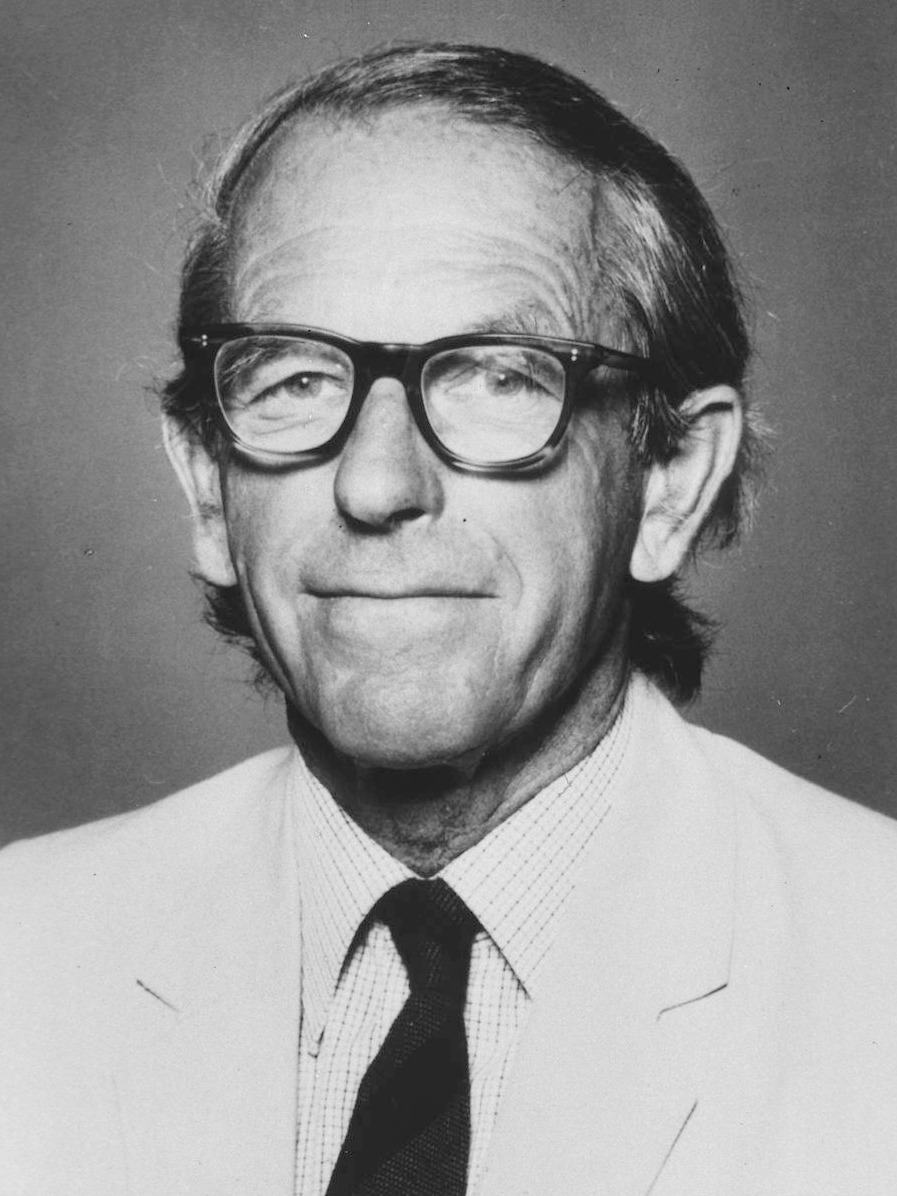
Frederick Sanger

In 1945, Frederick Sanger described its use for determining the N-terminal amino acid in polypeptide chains, in particular insulin. Sanger's initial results suggested that insulin was a smaller molecule than previously estimated (molecular weight 12,000), and that it consisted of four chains (two ending in glycine and two ending in phenylalanine), with the chains cross-linked by disulfide bonds. Sanger continued work on insulin, using dinitrofluorobenzene in combination with other techniques, eventually resulted in the complete sequence of insulin (consisting of only two chains, with a molecular weight of 6,000).

Following Sanger's initial report of the reagent, the dinitrofluorobenzene method was widely adopted for studying proteins, until it was superseded by other reagents for terminal analysis (e.g., dansyl chloride and later aminopeptidases and carboxypeptidases) and other general methods for sequence determination (e.g., Edman degradation).

Dinitrofluorobenzene reacts with the amine group in amino acids to produce dinitrophenyl-amino acids. These DNP-amino acids are moderately stable under acid hydrolysis conditions that break peptide bonds. The DNP-amino acids can then be recovered, and the identity of those amino acids can be discovered through chromatography. More recently, Sanger's reagent has also been used for the rather difficult analysis of distinguishing between the reduced and oxidized forms of glutathione and cysteine in biological systems in conjunction with HPLC. This method is robust enough that it can be performed in such complex matrices as blood or cell lysate.

Sanger's method of peptide end-group analysis: A derivatization of N-terminal end with Sanger's reagent (DNFB), B total acid hydrolysis of the dinitrophenyl peptide

== See also ==
- N-Terminal amino acid analysis

== Literature ==
- Schaefer, T. (1962). "The Proton Magnetic Resonance Spectrum of 1-Fluoro-2,4-Dinitrobenzene". Canadian Journal of Chemistry. 40 (3): 431–433. doi:10.1139/v62-068.
- Nageswara Rao, B.D. (1964). "The1H and19F resonance spectra of 1-fluoro-2,4-dinitrobenzene". Molecular Physics. 7 (4): 307–310. Bibcode:1964MolPh...7..307N. doi:10.1080/00268976300101071.
- Wilkins, A.; Small, R. W. H. (1991). "Structure of 1-fluoro-2,4-dinitrobenzene". Acta Crystallographica Section C. 47 (1): 220–221. Bibcode:1991AcCrC..47..220W. doi:10.1107/S0108270190007326.
