= C7H5NS =

The molecular formula C_{7}H_{5}NS (molar mass: 135.19 g/mol, exact mass: 135.0143 u) may refer to:

- Benzothiazole
- Phenyl isothiocyanate (PITC)
