= DNSA =

DNSA may refer to:

- Dansyl amide, a fluorescent dye
- 3,5-Dinitrosalicylic acid, used in assay of alpha-amylase
