= Exonuclease I =

Exonuclease I may refer to one of two enzymes:

- Phosphodiesterase I
- Exodeoxyribonuclease I
