= Drop-Seq =

Single-Cell RNA-Sequencing Method

Overview of the Drop-Seq Workflow

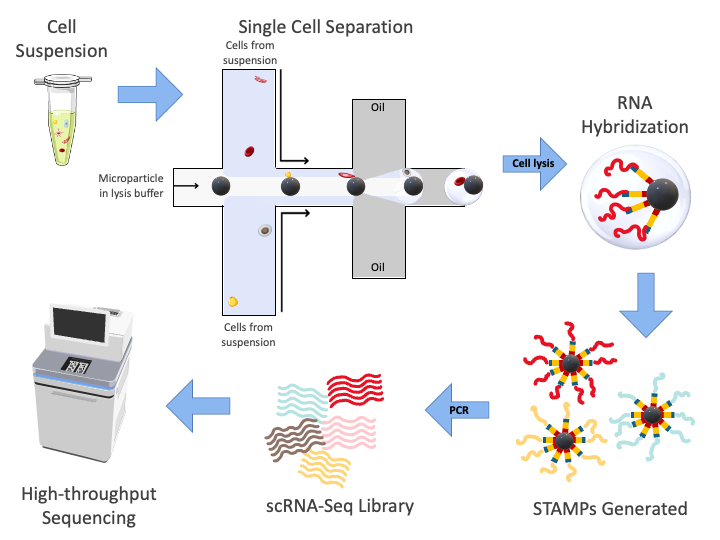
Cells are collected from a tissue sample to form the single-cell suspension. This suspension makes up the first aqueous phase, which is injected into the microfluidic device. The second aqueous phase contains uniquely barcoded microparticles (beads) suspended in a lysis buffer. A microparticle and a cell are captured together in a droplet, which is encapsulated in oil. After droplet formation, the cells are immediately lysed, and their mRNAs become hybridized to the primers on the microparticle surface. The droplets are then broken and the microparticles are collected and washed. The mRNAs are reverse-transcribed to generate single-cell transcriptomes attached to microparticles (STAMPs). The barcoded STAMPs are amplified in pools by PCR and can then be sequenced on a high-throughput sequencer.

Drop-Seq is a high-throughput, single-cell RNA sequencing (scRNA-seq) technology used to analyze the mRNA expression of thousands of individual cells by separating them into nanoliter-sized droplets for parallel analysis.

This method relies on combining a single cell with a uniquely barcoded microparticle (bead) into a single droplet using a microfluidic device. Each cell is lysed within the droplet, releasing its mRNA contents, which binds to an oligo-dT-containing primer sequence on its companion microparticle, capturing polyadenylated mRNA. The primers additionally contain cell barcodes, which are used to identify the cell-of-origin of each transcript, and a unique molecular identifier (UMI), enabling the identification of PCR duplicates. The collection of mRNA-bound microparticles are reverse-transcribed in bulk to form single-cell transcriptomes attached to microparticles (STAMPs). Template switching of reverse-transcriptase is employed to introduce a PCR handle downstream of the synthesized cDNA to enable efficient cDNA amplification. Using a high-throughput sequencer, paired-end reads are generated and aligned to a reference genome to identify the cDNA gene-of-origin and grouped by their cell barcode to determine its cell-of-origin.

Drop-Seq has been applied to various fields of research including breast cancer, drug responses studies, and the classification of retinal bipolar neurons in mice. Despite its numerous advantages, Drop-Seq has limitations, including low cell capture efficiency, poor detection of lowly expressed genes, and low rates of read mapping to the genome.

== History ==
In the late 1990s, the development of DNA microarrays enabled the examination of thousands of transcripts at once. Initial studies using microarrays focused on determining differentially expressed genes between normal cells and their corresponding cancerous cells. However, microarrays rely on a priori knowledge of genomic sequences, have limited sensitivity, and are prone to cross-hybridization. The development of RNA-Seq in the mid 2000s enabled comprehensive transcriptome analysis, overcoming some limitations of microarrays, such as their reliance on pre-designed probes, limited sensitivity, and susceptibility of cross-hybridization. This technology can provide insight into functional pathways, regulation of biological processes, alternative splicing, allele-specific expression, and novel transcripts.

A caveat of early RNA-seq methods is that they measured the average gene expression levels of all cells in a sample, masking cellular heterogeneity. As a result, RNA-Seq was quickly adapted for single-cell analysis, known as single-cell RNA sequencing (scRNA-Seq), enabling the study of gene expression at the resolution of individual cells. By profiling the transcriptomes of single cells, scRNA-Seq enables the study of cell-type-specific gene expression patterns and rare cell types, playing a crucial role in understanding tumour heterogeneity and evolution. Early scRNA-Seq methods were limited to profiling only hundreds to a few thousand cells per experiment. These methods required cells to be separated by flow sorting or microfluidics, followed by the amplification of each cell's transcriptome individually, highlighting the need for fast and scalable approaches to characterize complex tissues under diverse conditions.

In 2015, Macosko et al. developed a method to analyze gene expression in thousands of cells in parallel by encapsulating individual cells in nanoliter-sized droplets. Additionally, a molecular barcoding strategy was implemented to trace the cell-of-origin for each transcript, enabling pooled sequencing while maintaining single-cell resolution.

== Scientific Principles and Mechanisms ==
Drop-Seq integrates principles of microfluidics, molecular barcoding and single-cell RNA sequencing to determine gene expression at a single-cell level. Drop-Seq's workflow can be broken down into cell and bead encapsulation, cell lysis and mRNA capture, STAMP-formation, cDNA synthesis and amplification, and bioinformatics analysis.

=== Cell and bead encapsulation ===
The protocol begins by capturing one cell and one uniquely barcoded bead together using a custom microfluidic device. This device consists of two aqueous input channels (one carrying a suspension of cells and the other containing the barcoded beads suspended in lysis buffer) that both flow into an oil channel. Laminar flow prevents the mixing of the aqueous inputs before droplet formation, ensuring that every droplet only contains one cell and one bead.

=== Cell lysis and mRNA capture ===
Immediately after droplet formation, the cells are lysed, releasing mRNAs that then hybridize onto the bead's surface at the oligo-dT primers. The capture of mRNA within the aqueous bubble ensures that cellular components are not lost. Once hybridization of mRNA onto the bead surface is completed, the droplets are broken using a reagent (perfluorooctanol in 30 ml of 6x SSC) that destabilizes the oil phase, releasing the beads into an aqueous solution. This reduces any hybridization effects due to the second-order kinetics of DNA base pairing.

=== Reverse transcription and cDNA amplification ===
After breaking the droplets, the microparticles are washed and resuspended in a reverse transcriptase mix and treated with exonuclease I to remove unextended primers. The mRNAs are then reverse-transcribed in bulk forming single-cell transcriptomes attached to microparticles (STAMPs). Once the STAMPs are formed, the beads are re-washed, counted, and aliquoted into PCR tubes for cDNA formation and amplification. Template switching adds a second primer at the poly-A tail, allowing the full cDNA to be read. As such, the cDNA molecules will have both the cell barcode and the UMI from the bead.

=== Bioinformatics analysis ===
Once sequencing of the cDNA is complete, researchers can determine three things: cell types within the population, gene expression within unique cell types, and gene expression of single cells. From the UMI's and cellular barcodes, the gene expression of an individual cell can be determined. To determine the cell type, the gene expression is compared to the gene expression of different cell populations to determine cell type probability.

== Characteristics and Properties ==
The Drop-Seq paradigm relies on uniquely barcoded beads and microfluidic droplet encapsulation to capture single cells and their mRNA for sequencing.

=== Barcoded beads ===
One of the main components of Drop-Seq is the use of microparticles functionalized with DNA primers that include four main elements for mRNA capture, quantification, and cell identification.

==== PCR barcode ====
Every DNA primer on every bead will have an identical constant region. This is used for downstream PCR and sequencing.

==== Cell barcodes ====
A cellular barcode is a sequence found on DNA primers of any one bead, but is unique across beads (every bead has a unique cellular barcode). Synthesis of the cell barcode involves a process known as a "split-and-pool" DNA synthesis strategy. Split-and-pool involves taking all of the microparticle beads and splitting them into four equal groups known as pools. Each pool will then receive one of the four DNA bases. The beads are then mixed together and the whole process is repeated 12 times, ensuring that each bead has a different sequence.

==== Unique molecular identifiers (UMIs) ====
The unique molecular identifier (UMI) is different on every primer to identify any PCR duplicates, ensuring proper quantification of mRNA. To construct the UMIs, the beads after the initial twelve rounds of split-and-pool DNA synthesis then undergo eight rounds of degenerate oligonucleotide synthesis.

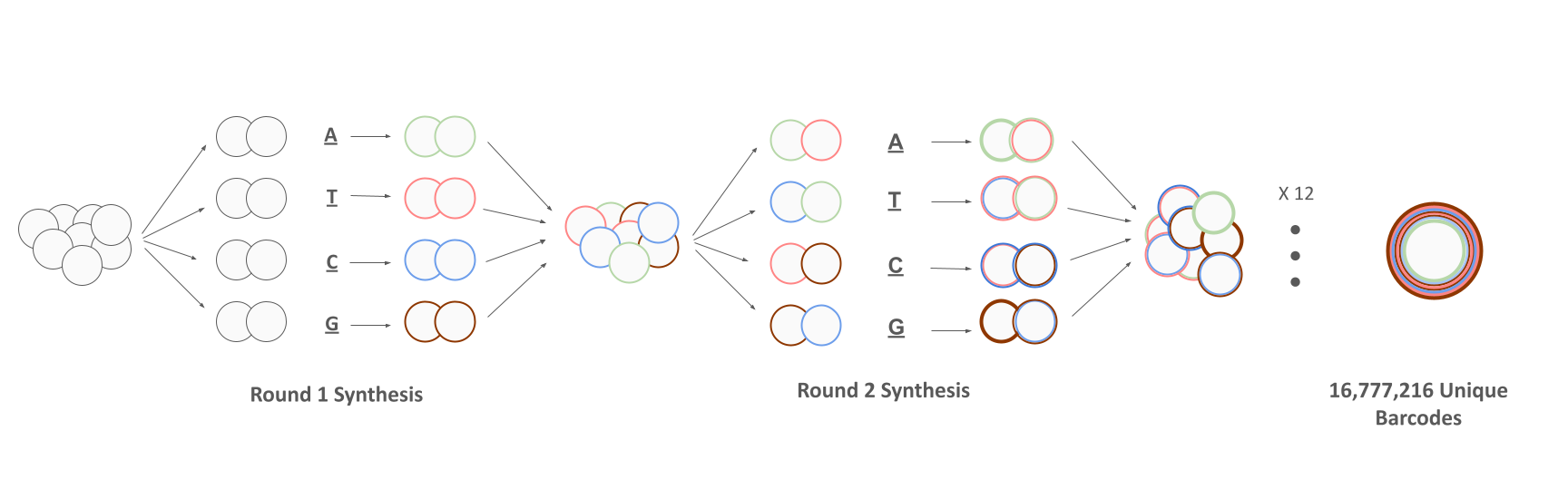
Split-and-pool workflow for Drop-Seq

==== Oligo-dT primers ====
The end of every oligonucleotide has a sequence of thirty thymines (T30) onto the 3' end for enzymatic priming.

=== Microfluidic channels ===
The microfluidic device is designed to allow co-flows of two aqueous solutions across an oil channel to form over 100,000 nanoliter sized droplets per minute.

== Applications ==
=== Advancing breast cancer stratification ===
Breast cancer patient stratification relies on receptor status and histological grading, but around 20% of patients lack actionable biomarkers, leading to unclear therapeutic intervention. Tumours are composed of multiple subpopulations and display heterogeneity in the estrogen, progesterone, and epidermal growth factor receptor 2 biomarkers. Drop-Seq was used to measure the gene expression profiles of 35,276 cells from 32 breast cancer cell line subtypes, resulting in the breast cancer single-cell atlas. This atlas can be used to automatically assign the cellular composition of patient tumour biopsies.

=== Detecting variability in response to drugs ===
Tyrosine kinase inhibitors are effective treatments for cancer patients harbouring mutations within receptor tyrosine kinases, yet resistance to these drugs often develops over time. Variability in drug responses has been observed among individual cells within a clonal cell population, leading to varied responses to anticancer therapies. Drop-Seq was used to determine cell-to-cell differences in EGFR-mutated NSCLC, revealing that this variability influences treatment responses. It was found that drug-tolerant states arise during treatment, and the distinct combinations of biomarkers identified through Drop-Seq could serve as prognostic or therapeutic targets for small-molecule therapies.

=== Classification of retinal bipolar neurons ===
The accurate identification and categorization of neuronal cell types is necessary for understanding brain development, function, and disease. Previous taxonomies categorize neurons using physiology, morphology, and molecular criteria, yet it is unclear whether classification using these properties agree with each other. Cell type classification through gene expression using scRNA-seq has emerged as a solution to these issues, which works by identifying molecular signatures that are unique to each type. Drop-Seq successfully identified 15 bipolar cells in the mouse retina, which included all types previously identified and two novel bipolar cell types. This study determined molecular markers for each bipolar cell type, and provided a framework for similar analyses of other heterogenous cell populations.

=== Male meiotic studies ===
The ability of Drop-Seq to generate large libraries from mixed cell suspensions has made it the most widely used scRNA-Seq method in male meiotic studies. Spermatogenesis is a complex process in which spermatogonial stem cells undergo terminal differentiation into mature sperm within the testis, driving considerable efforts to understand germ cell differentiation programs. Drop-Seq was used to analyze 34,633 cells isolated from mouse testis, which enabled the generation of a detailed cellular and molecular atlas of cell types present in the testis, including two previously undescribed adult somatic cell populations. This study further revealed the continuous nature of germ cell development and identified new candidate transcriptional regulators of germ cell differentiation.

== Advantages and Limitations ==
=== Advantages ===
Drop-Seq enables the profiling of thousands of individual cells in a highly parallel manner, enabling large-scale studies that can help deepen our understanding of complex tissues and cell populations in a fast and scalable way. Since Drop-Seq uses massive parallelization to increase throughput and minimize labour costs, it is highly used in mapping single-cell atlases for multicellular organisms and has spread to hundreds of labs globally as a core scRNA-seq method. The cost of materials to construct a Drop-Seq setup in a lab is around $6,000, making it an accessible technology for most laboratories. Additionally, the cost per cell is about $0.07, making Drop-Seq the most cost effective choice compared to the other widely used droplet-based ultra-high-throughput scRNA-seq systems.

=== Limitations ===
Drop-Seq has a low cell capture efficiency ranging from < 2% to 12.8% of input cells, making this method unsuitable for clinical samples with limited material. Due to the barcoding and library preparation strategy utilized, only the 3' end of the transcript is sequenced, losing information that full-coverage techniques can provide. This lost information includes isoform usage analysis, allelic expression data, and RNA editing sites. Furthermore, full-length scRNA-seq approaches may better detect low abundance transcripts and weakly expressed genes. Drop-Seq has lower gene-per-cell sensitivity compared to other scRNA-seq methods, detecting a median of 4,811 genes per cell. This decreased sensitivity makes Drop-Seq less effective at detecting weakly expressed genes and low abundance transcripts. Of the sequenced cDNA, only 60-80% of high quality reads will map to the genome, and > 30% of these reads are later removed during downstream analysis as they originate from cells that were co-encapsulated with low-quality beads. This, in turn, increases sequencing costs due to the need to sequence at high read depth.

== Comparison with Other Droplet-Based Sequencing Techniques ==
Technique	Mechanism	Advantages	Limitations
Drop-Seq	An aqueous droplet is formed in an oil channel containing a uniquely barcoded bead and a single cell. The cell is then lysed and the mRNA is captured onto the bead surface before transcription. The resulting cDNA has information about the mRNA and the unique cellular and molecular identifiers.	Low cost per cell provides institutions with an accessible method to perform single-cell transcriptomics.	The capture rate of Drop-Seq is low and does not have a high enough sensitivity to capture low abundance transcripts.
smRandom-seq	Droplet based sequencing method that uses bacteria (E. Coli) and CRISPR-based rRNA depletion to tag and generate cDNA for sequencing and analysis.	High throughput sequencing technique with up to 99% specificity within species with a 1.6% doublet rate.	Potential biases exist in cell number, UMI count, and detected genes when using mixes of different bacterial species.
Overloading And unpacKing (OAK)	Uses an initial round of multi-cell compartmentalization followed by a second aliquoting round resulting in combinatorial indexing.	Is able to resolve single cells from multi-cell droplets using a single microfluidic channel, reducing costs.	Has a higher multiplet rate due to multi-cellular droplets compared to other droplet based sequencing methods.
inDrop	Cells are isolated and fused with a hydrogel bead containing barcoded oligos during droplet formation. Primers are released by UV-irradiation-induced cleavage, mobilizing the primers for reverse-transcription inside the droplets before they are broken. Amplification of cDNA is performed via CEL-Seq.	This method works well for sample sizes with a limited number of cells, offering a capture efficiency of 60-90% while remaining relatively low in cost.	Library construction requires more labour and a higher level of technical skill. Additionally, this method suffers from high technical noise, low sensitivity, and captures only the 3' end of transcripts.
10X Genomics Chromium	The 10X Genomics Chromium method partitions cells into nanoliter-sized Gel Beads-in-emulsion, each containing barcoded oligos. Within the droplets, beads are dissolved which release the primers into solution. Reverse-transcription is conducted within the droplets before they are broken and the resulting cDNA is amplified using a template-switching mechanism.	The Chromium machine is easy to operate, and 10X Genomics provides substantial technical support. Thousands of single-cell libraries can be generated in a shorter time frame compared to other droplet-based scRNA-seq methods, while maintaining low technical noise. The platform can capture both the 3' and 5' ends of transcripts using a separate 5' Gene Expression Kit.	The 10X Genomics Chromium platform is more expensive than other scRNA-seq methods, costing 3-4 times more than Drop-Seq or inDrop. Additionally, the platform slightly favours shorter genes and genes with higher GC content.
