= Deterministic Barcoding in Tissue for Spatial Omics Sequencing =

DNA barcoding technique

Deterministic Barcoding in Tissue for Spatial Omics Sequencing (DBiT-seq) was developed at Yale University by Rong Fan and colleagues in 2020 to create a multi-omics approach for studying spatial gene expression heterogenicity within a tissue sample. This method can be used for the co-mapping mRNA and protein levels at a near single-cell resolution in fresh or frozen formaldehyde-fixed tissue samples. DBiT-seq utilizes next generation sequencing (NGS) and microfluidics. This method allows for simultaneous spatial transcriptomic and proteomic analysis of a tissue sample. DBiT-seq improves upon previous spatial transcriptomics applications such as High-Definition Spatial Transcriptomics (HDST) and Slide-seq by increasing the number of detectable genes per pixel, increased cellular resolution, and ease of implementation.

A commercial implementation of DBiT-seq-based spatial omics has been developed by AtlasXomics, a Yale University spin-out that provides microfluidic chips and reagent kits for applying DBiT-seq to spatial ATAC-seq, CUT&Tag, and related assays on fresh-frozen and formalin-fixed paraffin-embedded tissue sections.

== Applications ==
In multicellular systems the function of each individual cell is impacted by their spatial location and surroundings. Thus, implementation of DBiT-seq to profile both mRNA and protein levels across a tissue in a spatial context could lead to a better understanding of many biological processes. DBiT-seq can be utilized across many different fields such as oncology, developmental biology, and pathology. Use in developmental biology may lead to a better understanding of how organogenesis occurs, and in oncology it may provide more insight into the role of heterogeneity in tumorigenesis and progression.

== Methodology ==
DBiT-seq uses a microfluidics system to deliver oligonucleotide barcodes in a precisely controlled pattern. The system applies two sets of oligonucleotide barcodes (A1 – A50 and B1 – B50) perpendicularly to produce a grid of unique barcodes across the section labelled A1B1, A1B2 and so on.

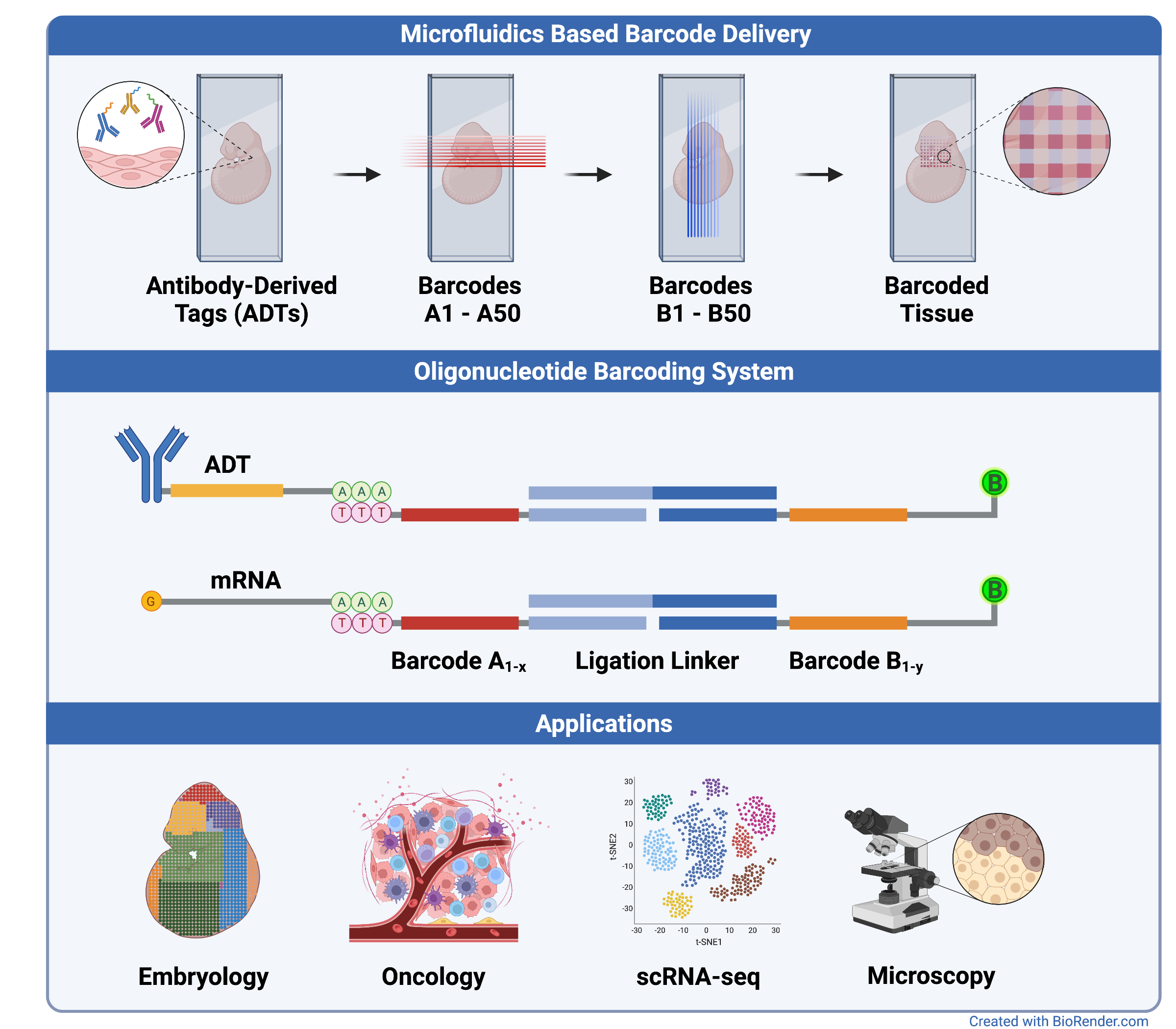
A summary of the barcoding technique used in DBiT-seq and its applications.

=== Device preparation ===
DBiT-seq requires a specially crafted microfluidics device to deliver the barcodes. Microfluidics enables the precise manipulation of fluids on the micron scale. The DBiTseq device is prepared using polydimethylsiloxane (PDMS) cast in a silicon wafer mold. The device allows the user to deposit the liquid reagents into appropriate channels on a macro scale with no special equipment. These reagents are then drawn by vacuum through the 10, 25, or 50 μm wide channels across the surface of the tissue section.

The other components of the DBiT-seq device are two PDMS reservoirs and an acrylic clamp system to hold the device flush to the tissue.

=== Tissue preparation and antibody staining ===
An advantage of DBiT-seq is the ability to use it on tissue slides preserved with formaldehyde in a process known as tissue fixing, which is incompatible with other spatial omics methodologies. Tissues are frozen, fixed and sectioned into very thin slices which are mounted on glass slides. If information about proteins in the sample is desired, the tissue is first stained with antibody-derived DNA tags (ADTs). ADTs are made up of an antibody conjugated to an oligonucleotide containing a unique barcode sequence and a Poly-A tail sequence. The Poly-A tail will be recognized by the Poly-T sequence on barcode A, enabling it to be associated with a spatial location.

=== Barcoding ===
Following antibody staining (if desired), the first set of 50 barcodes are applied to the tissue sample using the first microfluidics chip. Each 'A' primer contains a unique barcode sequence, a ligation linker, and a poly T sequence. The poly-T sequence binds to the poly-A tail on mRNAs in the tissue sample and on the ADTs applied earlier. Reverse transcription then generates the first cDNA strand containing the barcode and mRNA or antibody tag sequence. Chip B is then applied to the same tissue slide. Chip B will deliver the second set of barcodes perpendicular to the first, creating a grid pattern. Each 'B' oligonucleotide contains a unique barcode sequence, a PCR handle, a ligation linker, and biotin for cDNA purification. The ligation linker sequences are used to ligate barcodes A and B together into a single DNA strand. Finally, a lysis step extracts the cDNA from the tissue into a pooled sample containing all of the barcoded strands.

=== Library preparation and sequencing ===
The cDNA lysate produced in step 3 is purified using streptavidin beads that recognize the biotin on barcode B. The complementary cDNA strand is then synthesized by reverse transcription, followed by PCR amplification and final purification of the library. The library is then sequenced using next-generation (Illumina) sequencing.

=== Data analysis ===
The tissue slide is imaged before, during, and after each barcoding step to enable precise association of spatial information obtained from the barcodes. Associating the barcodes with each mRNA sequence provides a spatial transcriptomics map of the tissue. While this is not a single-cell methodology, the 10 uM channels capture only 1-2 cells per square, generating near-single-cell resolution. The ADT sequences capture spatial proteomic information that can be compared to the transcriptomic data. Specific cell populations can be identified in two ways. First, by matching the transcriptome to previous single-cell RNA-seq (scRNA-seq) profiles for each cell type. Second, using spatial differential expression (SpatialDE), a pattern recognition software that can differentiate tissue types without scRNA-seq data.

== Advantages and limitations ==
=== Advantages ===
DBiT-seq provides an advantage over other spatial-omics techniques by allowing the co-mapping of mRNAs and proteins. This provides both transcriptomic and proteomic data for analysis. The technique can be easily implemented and adapted to researcher's needs and proteins of interest. This method can be used successfully on H&E and immunostained tissue samples, as well as with formaldehyde-fixed tissue samples. The channels used for barcoding can be changed to adjust for resolution requirements from 10 μm, 25 μm, and 50 μm.

=== Limitations ===
The resolution of DBiT-seq does not have single cell resolution, but it is near single cell resolution. The pixel size has a theoretical limit of ~5 μm, which is small enough to allow for single or fraction of a single cell observation but has not been implemented. With the current channel configurations there is a size limitation to mapping area on a tissue, using 10 μm channels this allows for only a 1 mm × 1 mm area of the tissue to be mapped. To overcome this limitation additional barcoding channels could be added to increase area covered.

== Summary ==
Tissues are made of heterogeneous populations of cells. Understanding how these cells work together and the role of each cell type in the tissue is important in fields such as cancer research and developmental biology. While advances in single cell omics technologies have improved our effort to understand these complex environments, spatial information has been notably lacking. This has been improved by the advent of spatial omics. DBiT-seq provides an accessible method to obtain spatial transcriptomic and proteomic information from fixed or fresh tissue sections. With 10, 25 or 50 μm resolution, DBiT-seq provides near single cell resolution and provides spatial omics data without the need for highly specialized imaging equipment.
