= Pehr Victor Edman =

Swedish biochemist

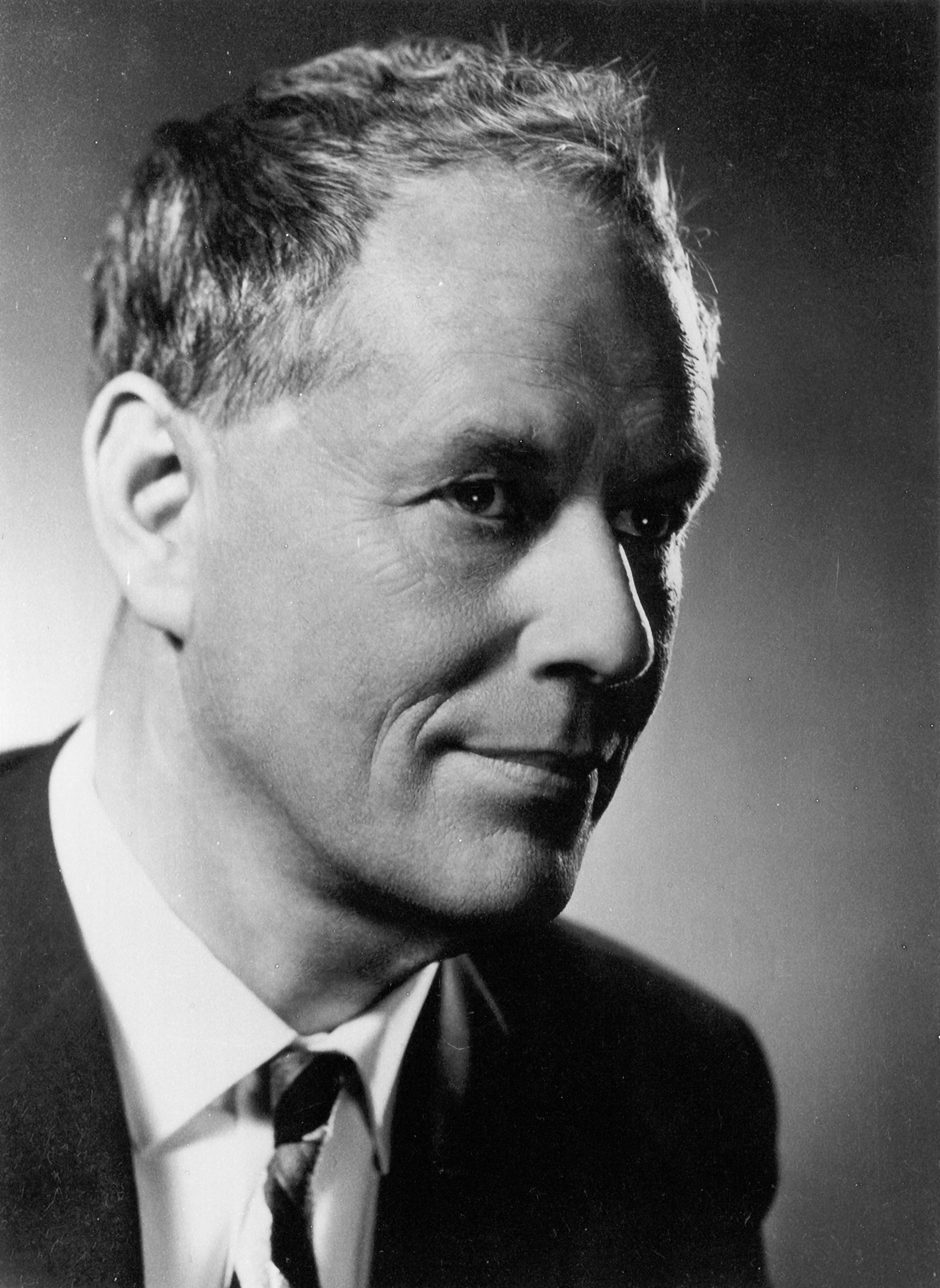
- Taken in 1968
- Born: 14 April 1916; Stockholm, Sweden
- Died: 19 March 1977 (aged 60); Munich, Germany
- Education: Karolinska Institutet
- Known for: Edman degradation, sequenator
- Awards: Fellow of the Australian Academy of Science (1968); Britannica Australia Prize (Science, 1968); Swedish Society of Physicians and Surgeons (Gold Medal, 1971); Fellow of the Royal Society (1974)
- Scientific career
- Fields: Biochemistry
- Workplaces: Rockefeller Institute of Medical Research, Princeton University, University of Lund, St. Vincent's School of Medical Research, Max-Planck-Institut of Biochemistry
- Doctoral advisor: Eric Jorpes

Pehr Victor Edman (14 April 1916 — 19 March 1977) was a Swedish biochemist. He developed a method for sequencing proteins; the Edman degradation.

== Early life ==
Edman was born in Stockholm, Sweden. In 1935, he started studying medicine at Karolinska Institutet, where he became interested in basic research and received a bachelor in medicine in 1938. His research was interrupted by the outbreak of World War II, where he was drafted to serve in the Swedish army. He returned to the Karolinska Institutet where he earned his doctoral degree under advice from Professor Erik Jorpes in 1946.

== Developing the Edman Degradation ==
At the time Edman started working on Angiotensin, it was just being recognized that proteins are distinct entities with a defined molecular mass, electric charge and structure. This inspired Edman to develop a method, that could be used to determine the sequence of amino acids in the protein. In 1947, he was awarded a travel stipend to go to Rockefeller Institute of Medical Research. When he returned to Sweden in 1950 to be an assistant professor at the University of Lund, he published his first paper using the method to determine the sequence of a protein, later known as Edman degradation. To his death, he continued to work to improve the method to be able to determine longer stretches with smaller amounts of sample.

== Late career ==
In 1957, he moved to Australia to be the director of St. Vincent's School of Medical Research, now known as St. Vincent's Institute of Medical Research. In 1967, he successfully developed an automated protein sequencer, called the sequenator, with his assistant Geoffrey Begg.

In 1972, he moved to the Max-Planck-Institut of Biochemistry, Martinsried near Munich. He worked with his second wife, Agnes Henschen, and she used Edman's method to sequence fibrinogen.

In 1977, Edman died of a brain tumor after a short coma. He and Henschen had two children, Carl and Helena.
