= Dinitrophenyl =

Dinitrophenyl is any chemical compound containing two nitro functional groups attached to a phenyl ring. It is a hapten used in vaccine preparation. Dinitrophenyl does not elicit any immune response on its own and it does not bind to any antigen.
