= Template-switching polymerase chain reaction =

Template-switching polymerase chain reaction (TS-PCR) is a method of reverse transcription and polymerase chain reaction (PCR) amplification that relies on a natural PCR primer sequence at the polyadenylation site, also known as the poly(A) tail, and adds a second primer through the activity of murine leukemia virus reverse transcriptase. This permits reading full cDNA sequences and can deliver high yield from single sources, even single cells that contain 10 to 30 picograms of mRNA, with relatively low levels (3-5%) of contaminating rRNA sequence. This technique is often employed in whole transcriptome shotgun sequencing. It is marketed by Clontech as Switching Mechanism At the 5' end of RNA Template (SMART) as well as by Diagenode as Capture and Amplification by Tailing and Switching (CATS).

== Drop-Seq ==
By using syringe pumps to transmit a steady rate of isolated cells and uniquely oligonucleotide-barcoded beads, it is possible to isolate individual cells and beads together in droplets of lysis buffer, where the polyadenylation site binds to a primer containing a unique, identifying sequence. This primer also contains a common sequence upstream of the identifier, so that after it is extended by reverse transcription, subsequent rounds of PCR will incorporate the tag, which permits each isolated cDNA that is sequenced to be tracked back to a specific originating bead. This permits the relative levels of transcripts in many individual cells to be analyzed simultaneously, creating a rational basis for the classification of these cells into particular cell types, or permitting the logical inference of in situ hybridization data from embryos without actually performing the experiment.
