= Wet lab =

Type of laboratory

A wet lab, or experimental lab, is a type of laboratory where it is necessary to handle various types of chemicals and potential "wet" hazards, so the room has to be carefully designed, constructed, and controlled to avoid spillage and contamination.

A dry lab might have large experimental equipment but minimal chemicals, or instruments for analyzing data produced elsewhere.

== Overview ==
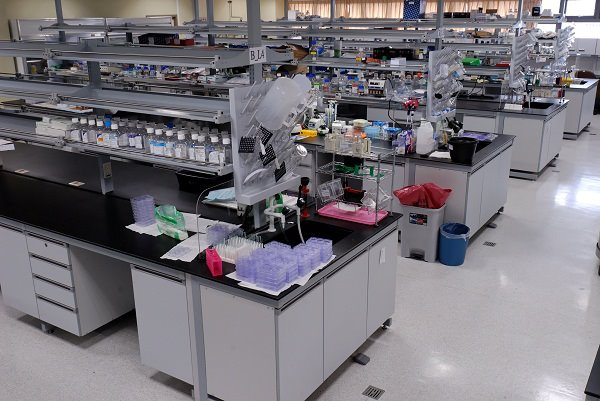
China Medical University (Taiwan)'s Laboratory

A wet lab is a type of laboratory in which a wide range of experiments are performed, for example, characterizing of enzymes in biology, titration in chemistry, diffraction of light in physics, etc. - all of which may sometimes involve dealing with hazardous substances. Due to the nature of these experiments, the proper appropriate arrangement of safety equipment are of great importance.

The researchers (the occupants) are required to know basic laboratory techniques including safety procedures and techniques related to the experiments that they perform.

== Laboratory design ==
At the present, lab design tends to focus on increasing the interactions between researchers through the use of open plans, allowing the space and opportunity for researchers to exchange ideas, share equipment, and share storage space; increasing productivity and efficiency of experiments. This style of design has been proposed to support team-based work, though more compartmentalised or individual spaces are still important for some types of processes which require separate/isolated space such as electron microscopes, tissue cultures, work/workers that may be disturbed by noise levels, etc.

Flexibility of laboratory design should also be promoted, for example, the wall and ceiling should be removable in case of expansion or contraction, the pipes, tubes and fume hoods should also be removable for future expansion, reallocation and change of use. A well thought-through design will ensure that a lab can be adjusted for any future use. The sustainability of resources is also a concern, so the amount of resources and energy used in the lab should be reduced where possible to save the environment, but still yield the same products.

As a laboratory consists of many areas such as wet lab, dry lab and office areas, wet labs should be separated from other spaces using controlling devices or dividers to prevent cross-contamination or spillage.

Due to the nature of processes used in wet labs, the environmental conditions may need to be carefully considered and controlled using a cleanroom system.

== See also ==
- Wet chemistry
