= Dansyl amide =

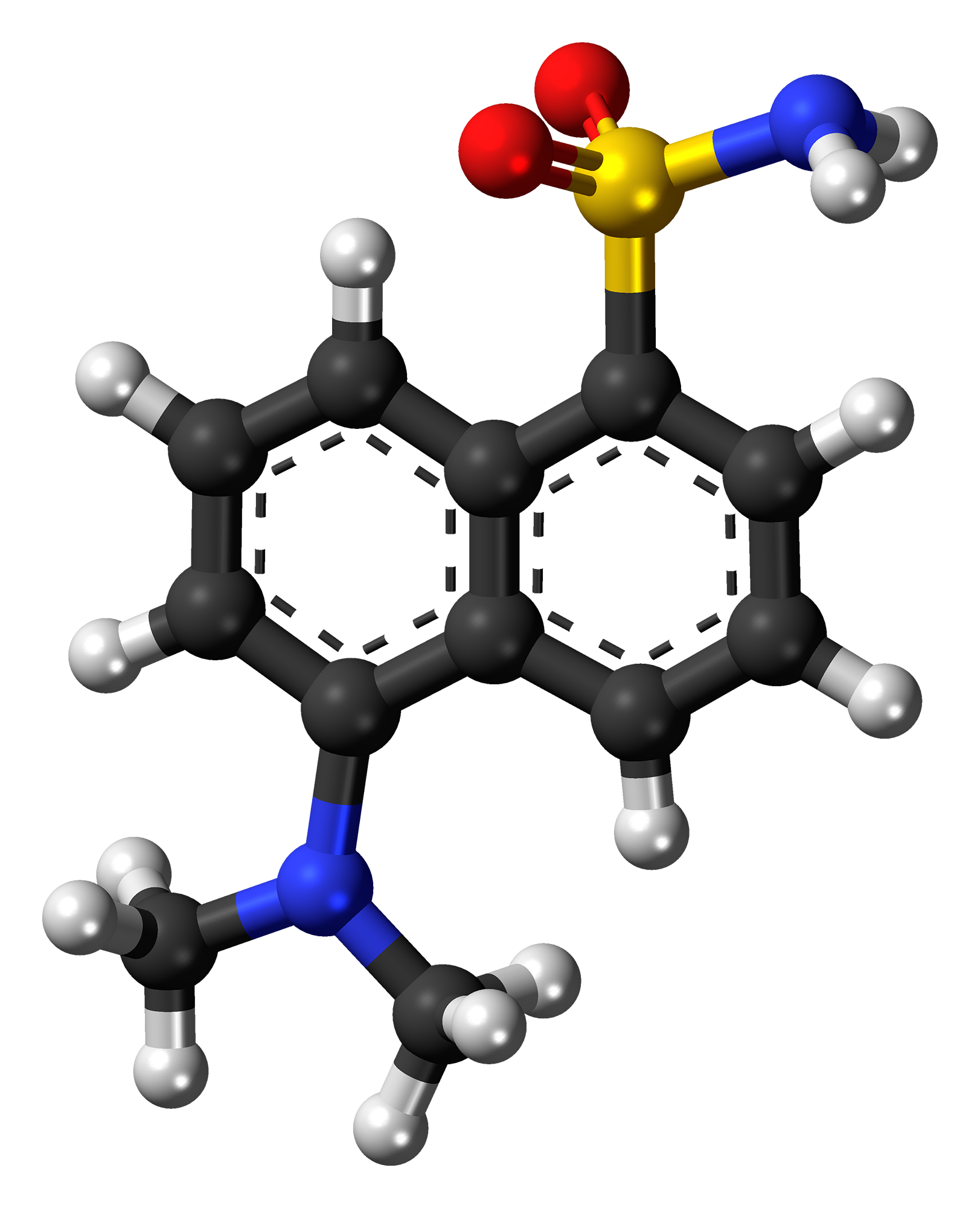

Names
- Preferred IUPAC name 5-(Dimethylamino)naphthalene-1-sulfonamide
- Other names Dansyl amide

Identifiers
CAS Number	1431-39-6
3D model (JSmol)	Interactive image
ChemSpider	58587
ECHA InfoCard	100.014.413
PubChem CID	65077
UNII	ZUZ5S5875E
CompTox Dashboard (EPA)	DTXSID70162306
- InChI: InChI=1S/C12H14N2O2S/c1-14(2)11-7-3-6-10-9(11)5-4-8-12(10)17(13,15)16/h3-8H,1-2H3,(H2,13,15,16) Key: TYNBFJJKZPTRKS-UHFFFAOYSA-N; InChI=1/C12H14N2O2S/c1-14(2)11-7-3-6-10-9(11)5-4-8-12(10)17(13,15)16/h3-8H,1-2H3,(H2,13,15,16) Key: TYNBFJJKZPTRKS-UHFFFAOYAD
- SMILES: O=S(=O)(c1cccc2c1cccc2N(C)C)N

Properties
Chemical formula	C_{12}H_{14}N_{2}O_{2}S
Molar mass	250.31676
- Except where otherwise noted, data are given for materials in their standard state (at 25 °C [77 °F], 100 kPa). verify (what is ?) Infobox references

Dansyl amide is a fluorescent dye that forms in a reaction between dansyl chloride and ammonia. It is the simplest representative of the class of dansyl derivatized amines, which are widely used in biochemistry and chemistry as fluorescent labels. The dansyl amide moiety is also called a dansyl group, and it can be introduced into amino acids or other amines in a reaction with dansyl chloride. The dansyl group is highly fluorescent, and it has a very high Stokes shift. The excitation maximum (ca 350 nm) is essentially independent on the medium, whereas the emission maximum strongly depends on the solvent and varies from 520 to 550 nm.
