= Phenyl isothiocyanate =

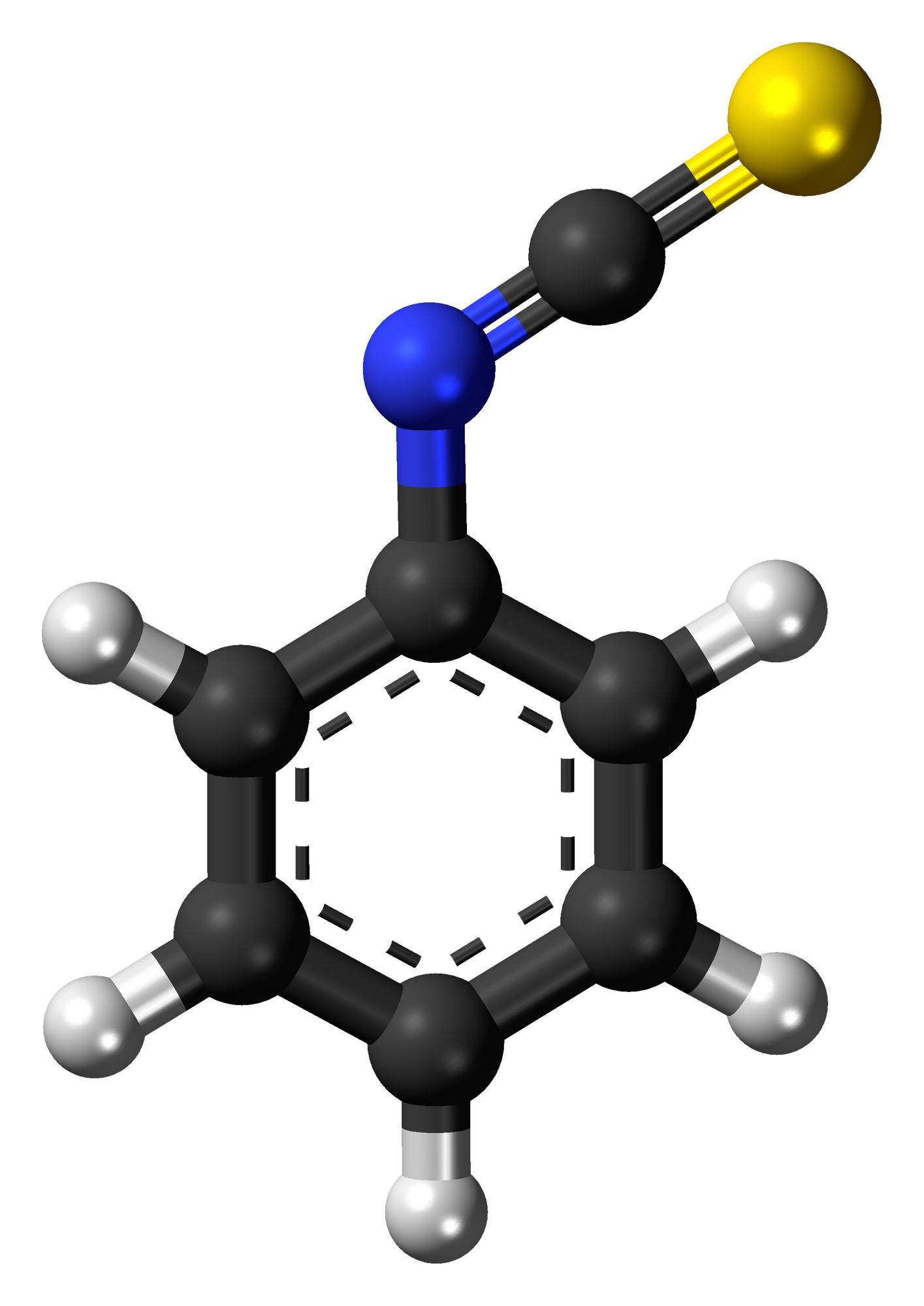

Names
- Preferred IUPAC name Isothiocyanatobenzene
- Other names Phenylisothiocyanate; Thiocarbanil

Identifiers
CAS Number	103-72-0
3D model (JSmol)	Interactive image
ChemSpider	7390
ECHA InfoCard	100.002.853
PubChem CID	7673
UNII	0D58F84LSU
CompTox Dashboard (EPA)	DTXSID0021129
- InChI: InChI=1S/C7H5NS/c9-6-8-7-4-2-1-3-5-7/h1-5H Key: QKFJKGMPGYROCL-UHFFFAOYSA-N; InChI=1/C7H5NS/c9-6-8-7-4-2-1-3-5-7/h1-5H Key: QKFJKGMPGYROCL-UHFFFAOYAC
- SMILES: C1=CC=C(C=C1)N=C=S

Properties
Chemical formula	C_{7}H_{5}NS
Molar mass	135.19 g/mol
Appearance	Colorless liquid with a pungent odor
Density	1.1288 g/cm^{3}
Melting point	−21 °C (−6 °F; 252 K)
Boiling point	221 °C (430 °F; 494 K)
Solubility in water	negligible
Solubility	ethanol, ether
Magnetic susceptibility (χ)	−86.0·10^{−6} cm^{3}/mol

Hazards
- Occupational safety and health (OHS/OSH)
Main hazards	toxic, flammable
- GHS labelling
Pictograms	(GHS02: Flammable) (GHS08: Health hazard) (GHS05: Corrosive)
Signal word	Danger
Hazard statements	H301, H311, H314, H317, H331, H334, H361
Precautionary statements	P261, P280, P301+P310, P301+P330+P331, P302+P350, P304+P341, P305+P351+P338, P310, P312, P342+P311
- Except where otherwise noted, data are given for materials in their standard state (at 25 °C [77 °F], 100 kPa). verify (what is ?) Infobox references

Phenyl isothiocyanate (PITC) is a reagent for organic chemistry. Also known as Edman's reagent, it is used in Edman degradation.

Edman degradation's main competitor uses ortho-phthaldehyde (OPA), which is less sensitive and thus amenable to automated, reversed-phase HPLC. However, PITC can be used for analysing secondary amines, unlike OPA.

Commercially available, this compound may be synthesized by the reaction of aniline with carbon disulfide and concentrated ammonia to give the ammonium dithiocarbamate salt of aniline in the first step, which on further reaction with lead(II) nitrate gives phenyl isothiocyanate:

Another method of synthesizing this reagent involves a Sandmeyer reaction using aniline, sodium nitrite and copper(I) thiocyanate.

== See also ==
- Isothiocyanate
- Naphthyl isothiocyanate
