= Exodeoxyribonuclease I =

Identifiers
- EC no.: 3.1.11.1
- CAS no.: 9037-46-1

Databases
- IntEnz: IntEnz view
- BRENDA: BRENDA entry
- ExPASy: NiceZyme view
- KEGG: KEGG entry
- MetaCyc: metabolic pathway
- PRIAM: profile
- PDB structures: RCSB PDB PDBe PDBsum
Search
- PMC: articles
- PubMed: articles
- NCBI: proteins

Exodeoxyribonuclease I (EC 3.1.11.1, Escherichia coli exonuclease I, E. coli exonuclease I, exonuclease I) is an enzyme that catalyses the following chemical reaction:

Exonucleolytic cleavage in the 3′- to 5′-direction to yield nucleoside 5′-phosphates

Preference for single-stranded DNA. The Escherichia coli enzyme hydrolyses glucosylated DNA.
