= Dansyl chloride =

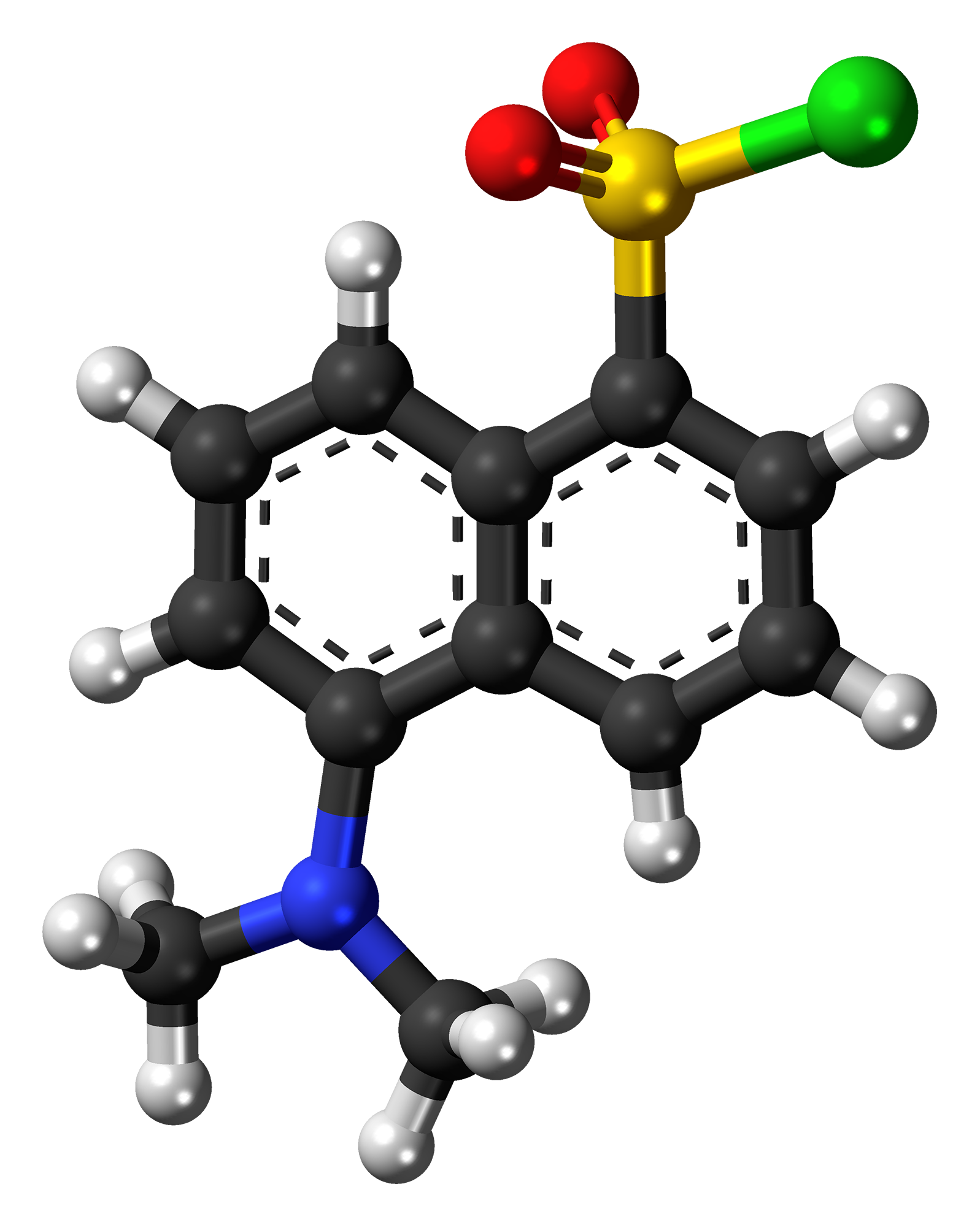

Names
- Preferred IUPAC name 5-(Dimethylamino)naphthalene-1-sulfonyl chloride

Identifiers
CAS Number	605-65-2
3D model (JSmol)	Interactive image
ChEBI	CHEBI:51907
ChemSpider	11308
ECHA InfoCard	100.009.175
PubChem CID	11801
RTECS number	QK3688000
UNII	QMU9166TJ4
CompTox Dashboard (EPA)	DTXSID2060543
- InChI: InChI=1S/C12H12ClNO2S/c1-14(2)11-7-3-6-10-9(11)5-4-8-12(10)17(13,15)16/h3-8H,1-2H3 Key: XPDXVDYUQZHFPV-UHFFFAOYSA-N; InChI=1/C12H12ClNO2S/c1-14(2)11-7-3-6-10-9(11)5-4-8-12(10)17(13,15)16/h3-8H,1-2H3 Key: XPDXVDYUQZHFPV-UHFFFAOYAI
- SMILES: ClS(=O)(=O)c1cccc2c1cccc2N(C)C

Properties
Chemical formula	C_{12}H_{12}ClNO_{2}S
Molar mass	269.74 g·mol^{−1}
Melting point	70 °C (158 °F; 343 K)

Hazards
- GHS labelling
Pictograms	(GHS05: Corrosive)
Hazard statements	H314
Precautionary statements	P260, P264, P280, P303+P361+P353, P304+P340, P305+P351+P338, P310, P321, P363, P405, P501
- Except where otherwise noted, data are given for materials in their standard state (at 25 °C [77 °F], 100 kPa). verify (what is ?) Infobox references

Dansyl chloride or 5-(dimethylamino)naphthalene-1-sulfonyl chloride is a reagent that reacts with primary amino groups in both aliphatic and aromatic amines to produce stable blue- or blue-green–fluorescent sulfonamide adducts. It can also be made to react with secondary amines. Dansyl chloride is widely used to modify amino acids; specifically, protein sequencing and amino acid analysis. Dansyl chloride may also be denoted DNSC. Likewise, a similar derivative, dansyl amide is known as DNSA.

In addition, these protein-DNSC conjugates are sensitive to their immediate environment. This, in combination with their ability to accept energy (as in fluorescence resonance energy transfer) from the amino acid tryptophan, allows this labeling technique to be used in investigating protein folding and dynamics.

The fluorescence of these sulfonamide adducts can be enhanced by adding alpha-cyclodextrin. Dansyl chloride is unstable in dimethyl sulfoxide, which should never be used to prepare solutions of the reagent.

The extinction coefficient of dansyl derivatives are important for measuring their concentration in solution. Dansyl chloride is one of the simplest sulfonamide derivatives, so it commonly serves as a starting reagent for the production of other derivatives. Exotic derivatives may have very different extinction coefficients, but others, such as dansyl amide, are similar to dansyl chloride in absorption and fluorescence characteristics. But even for dansyl chloride, there are a variety of extinction coefficient values that have been reported. Some of the values are used to estimate the extent of success in attempts to conjugate the dye to a protein. Other values may be used to determine a precise concentration of a stock solution. See the table below for specific values and their uses.

For all of the studies below, the absorption value is always taken at the maximum that appears between 310 nm and 350 nm. The peak is broad, so the measurement is not very sensitive to wavelength miscalibration of the spectrophotometer, and error due to miscalibration can be avoided by taking the value at the maximum instead of strictly using 330 nm.

Species	Extinction Coefficient [M^{−1}·cm^{−1}]	Notes
DNSC-protein	3300	Use for DNSC-protein conjugates; Used to determine degree of labeling in chymotrypsin and ovalbumin
DNSC	4350	In bicarbonate buffer; maximum is shifted to ~315 nm
DNSC	4550	In water; peak shifted to 312 nm
DNSA	4050	In 60% ethanol; Measured at 329 nm
DNSC	4000	Conditions are not given; no reference to the source of this value

== Preparation ==
This compound may be prepared by reacting the corresponding sulfonic acid with excess phosphorus oxychloride (POCl_{3}) at room temperature.
