= DNA: The Story of Life =

British television documentary series

DNA: The Story of Life is a four-part Channel 4 documentary series on the discovery of DNA, broadcast in 2003.

The series was broadcast to celebrate fifty years since the 1953 discovery. The first episode was broadcast on Saturday March 8, 2003 at 7pm.

== Episodes ==
=== Episode 1 - The Secret of Life ===
It covered the discovery of DNA in 1953. Maurice Wilkins and his involvement with the Manhattan Project, speaking in his university office in London; Linus Pauling's son Peter, of Caltech, now lived in Wales; Linus Pauling approached the discovery of the structure of DNA in a much more methodical rigid manner, perhaps in a plodding way, and Pauling was never one to take the same un-thought-through reckless gambles that Watson and Crick would take; but those ambitious reckless gambles of Watson and Crick would find the structure of DNA; the 1974 BBC documentary The Race for the Double Helix; Watson attended a lecture on the latest X-ray data on DNA at Somerset House in London in November 1951, with the project in Cambridge later producing their first DNA model on 28 November 1951; Sir John Randall, head of the London project, telephoned Lawrence Bragg in Cambridge, with his displeasure at how Watson and Crick had borrowed London's DNA structure X-ray data, which resulted in Watson and Crick being chastened, and removed from their work on DNA structure at Cambridge; but at the London project, events were being often undermined by frosty wooden relationships, and a complete lack of human empathy, as believed Raymond Gosling; at Cambridge, biochemist Erwin Chargaff, of Columbia University, had dinner with Watson and Crick, and although he largely disliked the pair, he explained his Chargaff's rules to them, where equal amounts of adenine and thymine had been found, which had applied to all living cells; Linus Pauling writes to Wilkins, asking for recent X-ray photographs, but is unlucky; on 6 May 1952, the London project takes Photo 51, which indicated a helix structure; in December 1952, Linus Pauling produced his first rudimentary model of DNA, but it was not at all similar to DNA; Watson travelled to the London project again, on 30 January 1953, and whilst looking for any possible photographic X-ray data, Wilkins happily showed him the Photo 51, not realising the dramatic leap in understanding that this photo may have provided for Watson, who himself couldn't believe his luck; Wilkins was not disappointed that Watson had viewed this picture, as he was looking for more scientific collaboration anyway, anywhere that he could find it; in early 1953, Watson and Crick could again resume their DNA project at Cambridge, as Lawrence Bragg realised the need to find the structure before Pauling could discover it; Watson sees the hydrogen bonds between the DNA base pair structure; Watson was later the Director of Cold Spring Harbor Laboratory, and Crick later worked in computational neuroscience.

=== Episode 2 - Playing God ===
The advances in genetic engineering. Herb Boyer studied bacteria in a California hospital; one morning he found a bacteria that could splice DNA, with enzymes (a restriction endonuclease); in March 1973 Boyer and Stanley Norman Cohen worked on an experiment to put a toad gene into a bacteria; the experiment worked, and the bacteria cell produced toad proteins; Paul Berg, of Stanford University was attempting to splice cancer genes with bacteria (E.coli) genes; one of his PhD students gave a talk about her work, in a group with Bob Pollack, of Columbia University, in attendance, who thought that such an experiment was unethical; Berg halted his work on genetic engineering, to examine any risks; the four-day Asilomar Conference on Recombinant DNA was held in February, in California, to look at possible risks; Alexander Capron of the University of Pennsylvania, who attended the conference; Jim Watson equated the caution to the risk, to communism; Sydney Brenner, of the University of Cambridge, to prove that the risk was low, himself drank genetically modified bacteria, mixed with milk; scientists would work in biosafety level 4 laboratories; Bob Swanson contacted Herb Boyer, to form a company - Genentech; Walter Gilbert of Harvard University wanted to make synthetic insulin; David Goeddel joined Genentech, and chose to build the insulin molecule step by step; Gilbert was banned from Harvard, so moved to England to work at a biosafety P4 laboratory at Porton Down in Wiltshire, to find the insulin gene; due to cross-contamination, but, after two years of work, he had found the gene of rat insulin instead; Genentech were the first to make synthetic insulin in bacteria; no Nobel prizes were awarded for the important genetic engineering discovery by Herb Boyer and his team; David Ebersman of Genentech.

Plant biologist Rob Horsch, whose father James Robert Horsch was an electrical engineer on the Apollo programme, wanted to modify crop genes, so approached Monsanto, working in a modest laboratory, at the Chesterfield Village Research Center in Chesterfield, Missouri, on Agrobacterium tumefaciens on petunia plants; he next worked on a genetically modified potato, first growing one on 2 June 1987; after proving it could be done, Horsch worked on cotton, more on the potato, wheat, soya, corn, and rice, to give pest resistance; current work includes crops with more vitamins.

=== Episode 3 - The Human Race ===
The 1990s and the start of Human Genome Project. Sir Alec Jeffreys, and his discovery on 17 September 1984 at the University of Leicester Department of Genetics, and how his wife Sue thought of possible applications; the Colin Pitchfork case in 1988; Fred Sanger FRS, of the MRC Laboratory of Molecular Biology, and reading the nucleotide sequence; he found a method by chemical markers, which attached to the different nucleotides; Sanger found the 5,000 nucleotide-sequence of a virus, after four years; Sanger invented DNA sequencing; Jeffreys found the portion (minisatellites) of human DNA where that same DNA sequencing, of Fred Sanger, could be best applied; but the human DNA sequence had around 3 billion nucleotide base pairs.

Jim Watson invited scientists to a meeting, in 1986, to discuss possibly sequencing the human genome; David Botstein was against any sequencing, but physicist Walter Gilbert was for the genome sequencing, estimating that it would cost £3bn over 30 years, and one scientist could sequence around 100,000 base pairs in one year; the US Congress approved the project funding in 1990, after Jim Watson put the case; Francis Collins took over the project from 1992; the repeated parts of the DNA sequence, that Alec Jeffreys found, could divide the human genome DNA up into parts, so that sixteen laboratories, around the world, sequenced one separate region, to finish in 2005; one third of the human genome would be sequenced at the Sanger Centre (now the Wellcome Sanger Institute) in South Cambridgeshire, headed in the UK by Sir John Sulston; by 1998, one-third had been sequenced, but Craig Venter thought that progress was much too slow, and would be quicker with shotgun sequencing, and computer reading of the sequence of bases; Leroy Hood of the Institute for Systems Biology, with Michael Hunkapiller of Applied Biosystems; on 10 May 1998, Venter announced that he would go it alone, as he thought that he could complete it by 2001; Venter was met by a torrent of verbal abuse from Jim Watson, at a meeting, who thought that the idea of a private company holding the DNA information was completely unacceptable; Venter had 300 DNA sequence-reading robots made, for his Celera Genomics company, which read DNA from five people, run by Tony White; Jim Watson returned to the US Congress to get more funding, and the public project bought £300,000 DNA sequencing machines from Celera.

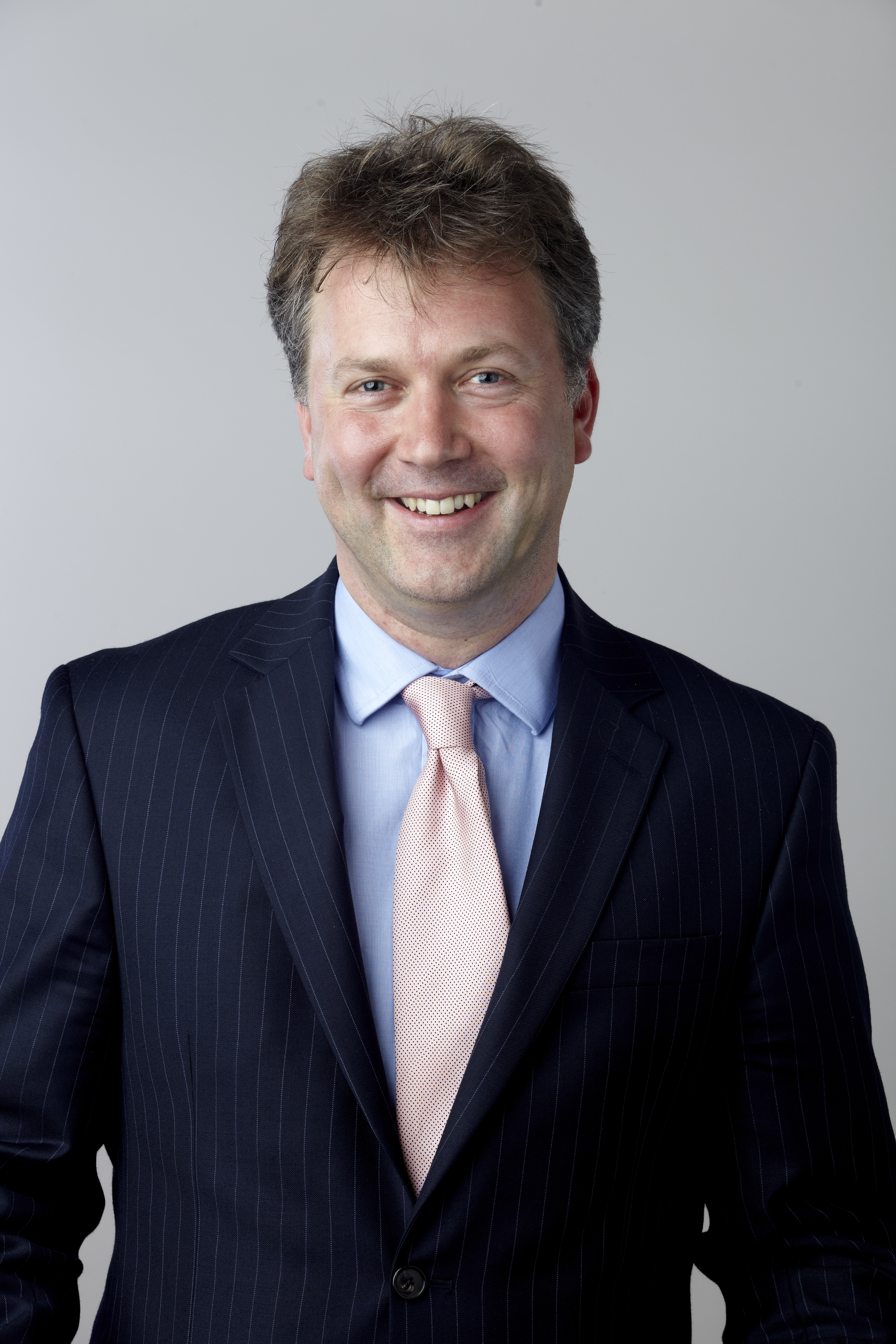
Ewan Birney developed the Ensembl genome software package, at Hinxton in Cambridgeshire, to untangle all of the enormous data from the Human Genome Project, in 2000

With the new machines, 4 million base pairs could be sequenced, by one laboratory, in one day; a main sequencing operation was at the Whitehead Institute at MIT, run by mathematician Eric Lander; Greek scientist Aristides Patrinos, who arranged for Collins and Venter to socially meet; the two sides agreed to make a joint announcement on 26 March 2000; software developers Jim Kent, for the public project, and Gene Myers, for Celera, had to reassemble the data from the many laboratories; but someone had to work out where the protein gene sequences were, so Ewan Birney FRS at the Sanger Centre in Cambridgeshire developed his Ensembl genome database project (with Tim Hubbard and Michele Clamp), to find the individual genes; 48 hours before the announcement on Monday 26 March, the two teams did not know how many genes that there were; the teams estimated around 38,000; around 25% of the genome was found to be gene deserts, and people shared largely the same DNA data - with only around 1 in 1200 base pairs that differed.

=== Episode 4 - Curing Cancer ===
The last episode was broadcast on Sunday 30 March 2003 at 8pm.; Mary-Claire King, of University of California, Berkeley, was puzzled as to why the breast cancer risk appeared to be mostly inherited; it would be the BRCA1 gene; she asked David Botstein, of MIT, for assistance; he looked at the spread of known genetic markers across the chromosomes of generations of families; if the markers were not found right across the generations, that part of the chromosome was not probably causing the BRCA mutation; different families' chromosomes were checked for 173 common genetic markers (known as restriction fragment length polymorphisms), which later led to identifying chromosome 17 in 1990; Mary Claire- King needed family information over many generations; she found it at the Family History Library in Utah, kept in immaculate condition by the Mormons (The Church of Jesus Christ of Latter-day Saints); Mark Skolnick also had looked at the Mormon family trees; in October 1987 Mary Claire-King appealed, on local television networks, for family histories, it would take seventeen years to find the BRCA1 gene; around 600,000 women in the US carried the BRCA1 gene; Barbara Weber of the University of Michigan; Mark Skolnick founded Myriad Genetics, to look for the BRCA1 gene, and his company found the mutation; Per Lønning, of Haukeland University Hospital in Norway, and son of Per Lønning, had collected cancer specimens, for possible later understanding of cancer genetics; David Botstein and Patrick O. Brown, who invented the DNA microarray; Brian Druker of the Oregon Health & Science University Hospital (OHSU), who started researching cancer genetics from 1979, and worked with Novartis to make Imatinib; Michael Wigler, of Cold Spring Harbor Laboratory, was finding cancer-causing genes

== Transmission ==
The series was repeated ten years later on More4.

A fifth part of the series was added to a DVD in 2004, entitled DNA: The Story of the Pioneers Who Changed the World

== Production ==
David Dugan was the producer, with Joe Bini the editor. It was a joint production with WNET.

== See also ==
- Timeline of the history of genetics
