= Dideoxynucleotide =

Chain-elongating inhibitor of DNA polymerase

Molecular structure of 2',3'-dideoxyadenosine triphosphate (ddATP)

Dideoxynucleotides are chain-elongating inhibitors of DNA polymerase, used in the Sanger method for DNA sequencing. They are also known as 2',3' because both the 2' and 3' positions on the ribose lack hydroxyl groups, and are abbreviated as ddNTPs (ddGTP, ddATP, ddTTP and ddCTP).

== Role in the Sanger method ==
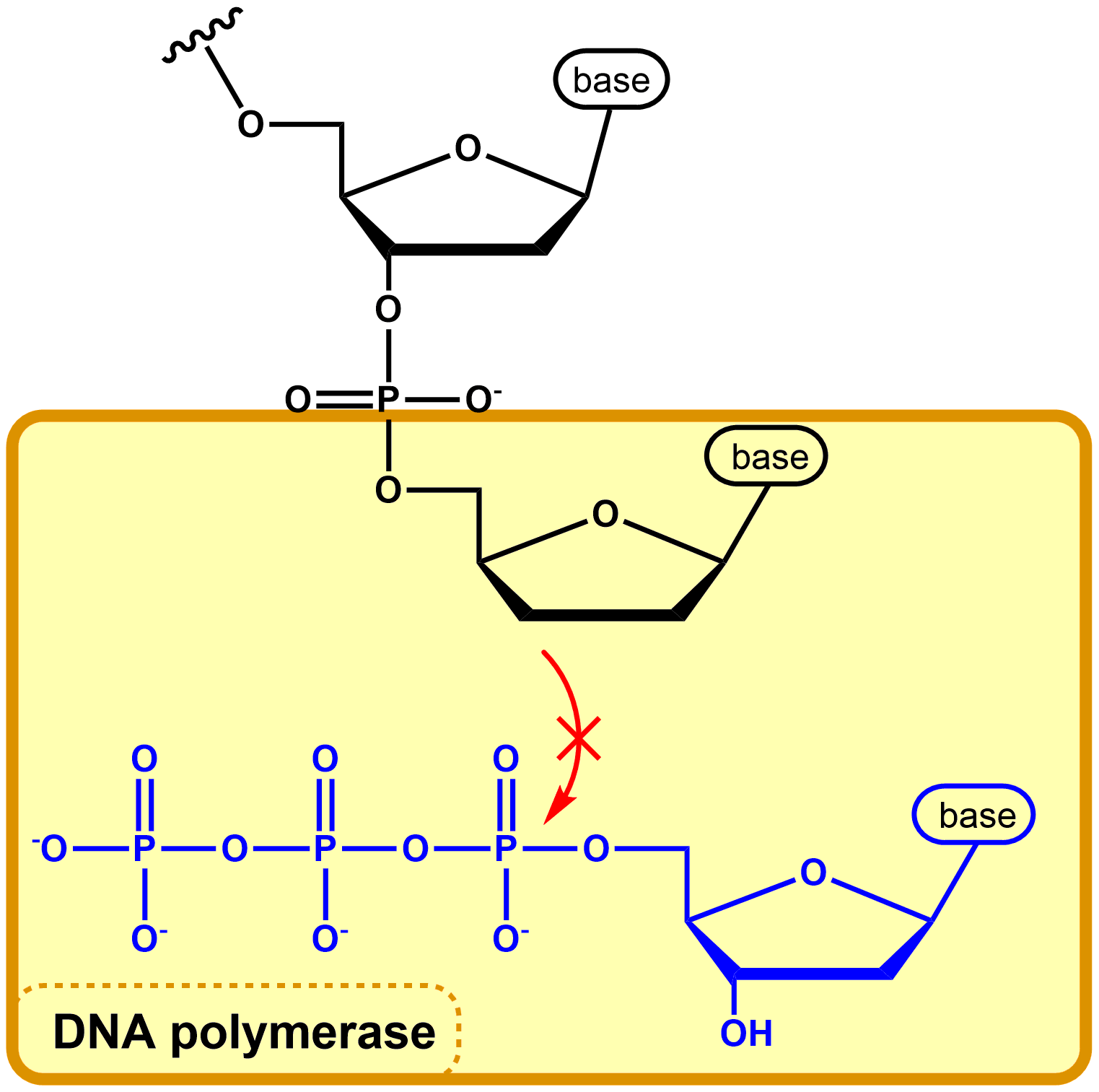
Inhibition of a nucleophilic attack due to the absence of the 3'-OH Group

The Sanger method is used to amplify a target segment of DNA, so that the DNA sequence can be determined precisely. The incorporation of ddNTPs in the reaction valves are simply used to terminate the synthesis of a growing DNA strand, resulting in partially replicated DNA fragments. This is because DNA polymerase requires the 3' OH group of the growing chain and the 5' phosphate group of the incoming dNTP to create a phosphodiester bond. Sometimes the DNA polymerase will incorporate a ddNTP and the absence of the 3' OH group will interrupt the condensation reaction between the 5' phosphate (following the cleavage of pyrophosphate) of the incoming nucleotide with the 3' hydroxyl group of the previous nucleotide on the growing strand. This condensation reaction would normally occur with the incorporation of a non-modified dNTP by DNA polymerase. In the simplest of terms, the nucleophilic attack of the 3' OH group leads to the addition of a nucleotide onto a growing chain. The absence of the 3' hydroxyl group inhibits this nucleophilic attack from happening, disabling the DNA polymerase's ability to continue with its function.

This discovery led to its appropriate name "Chain-terminating nucleotides". The dideoxyribonucleotides do not have a 3' hydroxyl group, hence no further chain elongation can occur once this dideoxynucleotide is on the chain. This can lead to the termination of the DNA sequence. Thus, these molecules form the basis of the dideoxy chain-termination method of DNA sequencing, which was reported by Frederick Sanger and his team in 1977 as an extension of earlier work. Sanger's approach was described in 2001 as one of the two fundamental methods for sequencing DNA fragments (the other being the Maxam–Gilbert method) but the Sanger method is both the "most widely used and the method used by most automated DNA sequencers." Sanger won his second Nobel Prize in Chemistry in 1980, sharing it with Walter Gilbert ("for their contributions concerning the determination of base sequences in nucleic acids") and with Paul Berg ("for his fundamental studies of the biochemistry of nucleic acids, with particular regard to recombinant DNA"), and discussed the use of dideoxynucleotides in his Nobel lecture.

=== DNA Sequencing ===
Dideoxynucleotides are useful in the sequencing of DNA in combination with electrophoresis. A DNA sample that undergoes PCR (polymerase chain reaction) in a mixture containing all four deoxynucleotides and one dideoxynucleotide will produce strands of length equal to the position of each base of the type that complements the type having a dideoxynucleotide present. That the taq polymerase used in PCR favors the ddGTP, is a pattern observed in various research. That is, each nucleotide base of that particular type has a probability of being bonded to not a deoxynucleotide but rather a dideoxynucleotide, which ends chain elongation. Therefore, if the sample then undergoes electrophoresis, there will be a band present for each length at which the complement of the dideoxynucleotide is present. It is now common to use fluorescent dideoxynucleotides such that each one of the four has a different fluorescence that can be detected by a sequencer; thus only one reaction is needed.

== Production ==
In a patented method, Tetrahydrofuran was used in a solvent containing 50 g (0.205 mols) of uridine (or, presumably, any unprotected nucleoside), 112 ml (1.03 mols) of methyl orthoformate and 10 g (52.6 mmols) of para-toluenesulfonic acid at room temperature with stirring. After stirring at room temperature for 24 hours, the reaction mixture was poured into an aqueous sodium bicarbonate solution followed by extraction with chloroform 5 times. The extract was dried over sodium sulfate and concentrated to give 49.5 g (0.173 mols) of 2',3'-o-methoxymethylideneuridine (yield, 84.5%). After this reaction, the uridine example product 2',3'-o-methoxymethylideneuridine is then dissolved in 50 ml of acetic anhydride at room temperature with stirring. The solution was heated to 140 °C. and kept at this temperature for 5 hours under reflux of the solvent. After cooling to room temperature, the solvent was removed by distillation under reduced pressure, 50 ml of water were added, and the mixture was extracted 3 times with 100 ml of chloroform. The extract was concentrated under reduced pressure, 30% ammonia water to obtain an 82.3% yield of 2',3'-dideoxy-2',3'-didehydrouridine. This product example is then hydrated to remove the double bond through dissolving it in methanol (10 ml) containing a catalyst (wet 5% palladium on carbon) (400 mg) in an atmosphere of hydrogen for 1 h to obtain the resultant dideoxynucleoside ( 2',3'-dideoxyuridine in this case). The dye nucleotide to be used will likely occur by treatment with a phosphorylation enzyme and biotinylation and reaction of the biotinylated substance with the dye. It is possible that immediate reaction with the dye may also occur, but extending the arm is claimed to increase efficiency in the case of using a mutant form of DNA polymerase.
