= Allan Maxam =

American geneticist (born 1942)

- Born: October 28, 1942 (age 83)
- Known for: Maxam–Gilbert sequencing
- Scientific career
- Fields: Molecular genetics
- Workplaces: Harvard University
- Doctoral advisor: Walter Gilbert

Allan Maxam (born October 28, 1942) is an American geneticist and one of the pioneers of molecular genetics. He co-developed the Maxam–Gilbert DNA sequencing method in 1976–1977 at Harvard University while working as a student in the laboratory of Walter Gilbert.

Maxam–Gilbert sequencing combined chemicals that cut DNA only at specific bases with radioactive labeling and polyacrylamide gel electrophoresis to determine the sequence of long DNA segments.

Their 1977 paper "A new method for sequencing DNA" was honored by a Citation for Chemical Breakthrough Award from the Division of History of Chemistry of the American Chemical Society for 2017. It was presented to the Department of Molecular & Cellular Biology at Harvard University.

== See also ==
- Frederick Sanger
- Sanger sequencing
