= Timeline of the history of genetics =

The history of genetics can be represented on a timeline of events from the earliest work in the 1850s, to the DNA era starting in the 1940s, and the genomics era beginning in the 1970s.

== Early timeline ==
- 1856–1863: Mendel studied the inheritance of traits between generations based on experiments involving garden pea plants. He deduced that there is a certain tangible essence that is passed on between generations from both parents. Mendel established the basic principles of inheritance, namely, the principles of dominance, independent assortment, and segregation.
- 1866: Austrian Augustinian friar Gregor Mendel's paper, Experiments on Plant Hybridization, published.
- 1869: Friedrich Miescher discovers a weak acid in the nuclei of white blood cells that today we call DNA. In 1871 he isolated cell nuclei, separated the nucleic cells from bandages and then treated them with pepsin (an enzyme which breaks down proteins). From this, he recovered an acidic substance which he called "nuclein".
- 1880–1890: Walther Flemming, Eduard Strasburger, and Edouard Van Beneden elucidate chromosome distribution during cell division.
- 1889: Richard Altmann purified protein free DNA. However, the nucleic acid was not as pure as he had assumed. It was determined later to contain a large amount of protein.
- 1889: Hugo de Vries postulates that "inheritance of specific traits in organisms comes in particles", naming such particles "(pan)genes".
- 1900: Mendelian principles are "rediscovered" and published by 3 botanists independently, Hugo de Vries, Carl Correns and Erich von Tschermak-Seysenegg, setting off a Mendelian revolution
- 1902: Archibald Garrod discovered inborn errors of metabolism. An explanation for epistasis is an important manifestation of Garrod's research, albeit indirectly. When Garrod studied alkaptonuria, a disorder that makes urine quickly turn black due to the presence of gentisate, he noticed that it was prevalent among populations whose parents were closely related.
- 1903: Walter Sutton and Theodor Boveri independently hypothesizes that chromosomes, which segregate in a Mendelian fashion, are hereditary units; see the chromosome theory. Boveri was studying sea urchins when he found that all the chromosomes in the sea urchins had to be present for proper embryonic development to take place. Sutton's work with grasshoppers showed that chromosomes occur in matched pairs of maternal and paternal chromosomes which separate during meiosis. He concluded that this could be "the physical basis of the Mendelian law of heredity."
- 1905: William Bateson coins the term "genetics" in a letter to Adam Sedgwick and at a meeting in 1906.
- 1908: G.H. Hardy and Wilhelm Weinberg proposed the Hardy–Weinberg equilibrium model which describes the frequencies of alleles in the gene pool of a population, which are under certain specific conditions, as constant and at a state of equilibrium from generation to generation unless specific disturbing influences are introduced.
- 1909: Wilhelm Johannsen introduced the term gene. He also coined the terms genotype and phenotype.
- 1910: Thomas Hunt Morgan shows that genes reside on chromosomes while determining the nature of sex-linked traits by studying Drosophila melanogaster. He determined that the white-eyed mutant was sex-linked based on Mendelian's principles of segregation and independent assortment.
- 1911: Alfred Sturtevant, one of Morgan's collaborators, invented the procedure of linkage mapping which is based on the frequency of crossing-over.
- 1913: Alfred Sturtevant makes the first genetic map, showing that chromosomes contain linearly arranged genes.
- 1918: Ronald Fisher publishes "The Correlation Between Relatives on the Supposition of Mendelian Inheritance" the modern synthesis of genetics and evolutionary biology starts. See population genetics.
- 1920: Lysenkoism Started, during Lysenkoism they stated that the hereditary factor are not only in the nucleus, but also in the cytoplasm, though they called it living protoplasm.
- 1923: Frederick Griffith studied bacterial transformation and observed that DNA carries genes responsible for pathogenicity.
- In Griffith's experiment, mice are injected with dead bacteria of one strain and live bacteria of another, and develop an infection of the dead strain's type.
  1928: Frederick Griffith discovers that hereditary material from dead bacteria can be incorporated into live bacteria.
- 1930s–1950s: Joachim Hämmerling conducted experiments with Acetabularia in which he began to distinguish the contributions of the nucleus and the cytoplasm substances (later discovered to be DNA and mRNA, respectively) to cell morphogenesis and development.
- 1931: Crossing over is identified as the cause of recombination; the first cytological demonstration of this crossing over was performed by Barbara McClintock and Harriet Creighton.
- 1933: Jean Brachet, while studying virgin sea urchin eggs, suggested that DNA is found in cell nucleus and that RNA is present exclusively in the cytoplasm. At the time, "yeast nucleic acid" (RNA) was thought to occur only in plants, while "thymus nucleic acid" (DNA) only in animals. The latter was thought to be a tetramer, with the function of buffering cellular pH.
- 1933: Thomas Morgan received the Nobel prize for linkage mapping. His work elucidated the role played by the chromosome in heredity. Morgan voluntarily shared the prize money with his key collaborators, Calvin Bridges and Alfred Sturtevant.
- 1941: Edward Lawrie Tatum and George Wells Beadle show that genes code for proteins; see the original central dogma of genetics.
- 1943: Luria–Delbrück experiment: this experiment showed that genetic mutations conferring resistance to bacteriophage arise in the absence of selection, rather than being a response to selection.

== The DNA era ==
- 1944: The Avery–MacLeod–McCarty experiment isolates DNA as the genetic material (at that time called transforming principle).
- 1947: Salvador Luria discovers reactivation of irradiated phage, stimulating numerous further studies of DNA repair processes in bacteriophage, and other organisms, including humans.
- 1948: Barbara McClintock discovers transposons in maize.
- 1950: Erwin Chargaff determined the pairing method of nitrogenous bases. Chargaff and his team studied the DNA from multiple organisms and found three things (also known as Chargaff's rules). First, the concentration of the pyrimidines (guanine and adenine) are always found in the same amount as one another. Second, the concentration of purines (cytosine and thymine) are also always the same. Lastly, Chargaff and his team found the proportion of pyrimidines and purines correspond each other.
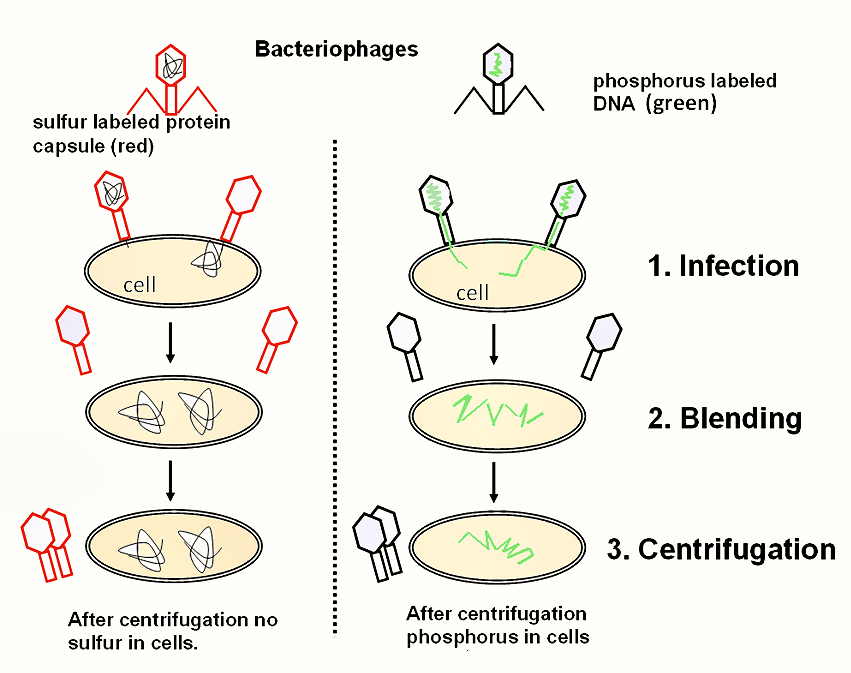
- Hershey–Chase experiment proves that phage genetic material is DNA.
  1952: The Hershey–Chase experiment proves the genetic information of phages (and, by implication, all other organisms) to be DNA.
- 1952: an X-ray diffraction image of DNA was taken by Raymond Gosling in May 1952, a student supervised by Rosalind Franklin.
- 1953: DNA structure is resolved to be a double helix by James Watson, Francis Crick and Maurice Wilkins.
- 1955: Alexander R. Todd determined the chemical makeup of nitrogenous bases. Todd also successfully synthesized adenosine triphosphate (ATP) and flavin adenine dinucleotide (FAD). He was awarded the Nobel prize in Chemistry in 1957 for his contributions in the scientific knowledge of nucleotides and nucleotide co-enzymes.
- 1955: Joe Hin Tjio, while working in Albert Levan's lab, determined the number of chromosomes in humans to be of 46. Tjio was attempting to refine an established technique to separate chromosomes onto glass slides by conducting a study of human embryonic lung tissue, when he saw that there were 46 chromosomes rather than 48. This revolutionized the world of cytogenetics.
- 1957: Arthur Kornberg with Severo Ochoa synthesized DNA in a test tube after discovering the means by which DNA is duplicated. DNA polymerase 1 established requirements for in vitro synthesis of DNA. Kornberg and Ochoa were awarded the Nobel Prize in 1959 for this work.
- 1957/1958: Robert W. Holley, Marshall Nirenberg, Har Gobind Khorana proposed the nucleotide sequence of the tRNA molecule. Francis Crick had proposed the requirement of some kind of adapter molecule and it was soon identified by Holey, Nirenberg and Khorana. These scientists help explain the link between a messenger RNA nucleotide sequence and a polypeptide sequence. In the experiment, they purified tRNAs from yeast cells and were awarded the Nobel prize in 1968.
- Meselson–Stahl experiment demonstrates DNA is semiconservatively replicated.
  1958: The Meselson–Stahl experiment demonstrates that DNA is semiconservatively replicated.
- 1960: Jacob and collaborators discover the operon, a group of genes whose expression is coordinated by an operator.
- 1961: Francis Crick and Sydney Brenner discovered frame shift mutations. In the experiment, proflavin-induced mutations of the T4 bacteriophage gene (rIIB) were isolated. Proflavin causes mutations by inserting itself between DNA bases, typically resulting in insertion or deletion of a single base pair. The mutants could not produce functional rIIB protein. These mutations were used to demonstrate that three sequential bases of the rIIB gene's DNA specify each successive amino acid of the encoded protein. Thus the genetic code is a triplet code, where each triplet (called a codon) specifies a particular amino acid.
- 1961: Sydney Brenner, Francois Jacob and Matthew Meselson identified the function of messenger RNA.
- 1964: Howard Temin showed using RNA viruses that the direction of DNA to RNA transcription can be reversed.
- 1964: Lysenkoism ended.
- 1966: Marshall W. Nirenberg, Philip Leder, Har Gobind Khorana cracked the genetic code by using RNA homopolymer and heteropolymer experiments, through which they figured out which triplets of RNA were translated into what amino acids in yeast cells.
- 1969: Molecular hybridization of radioactive DNA to the DNA of cytological preparation by Pardue, M. L. and Gall, J. G.
- 1970: Restriction enzymes were discovered in studies of a bacterium, Haemophilus influenzae, by Hamilton O. Smith and Daniel Nathans, enabling scientists to cut and paste DNA.
- 1972: Stanley Norman Cohen and Herbert Boyer at UCSF and Stanford University constructed Recombinant DNA which can be formed by using restriction Endonuclease to cleave the DNA and DNA ligase to reattach the "sticky ends" into a bacterial plasmid.

== The genomics era ==
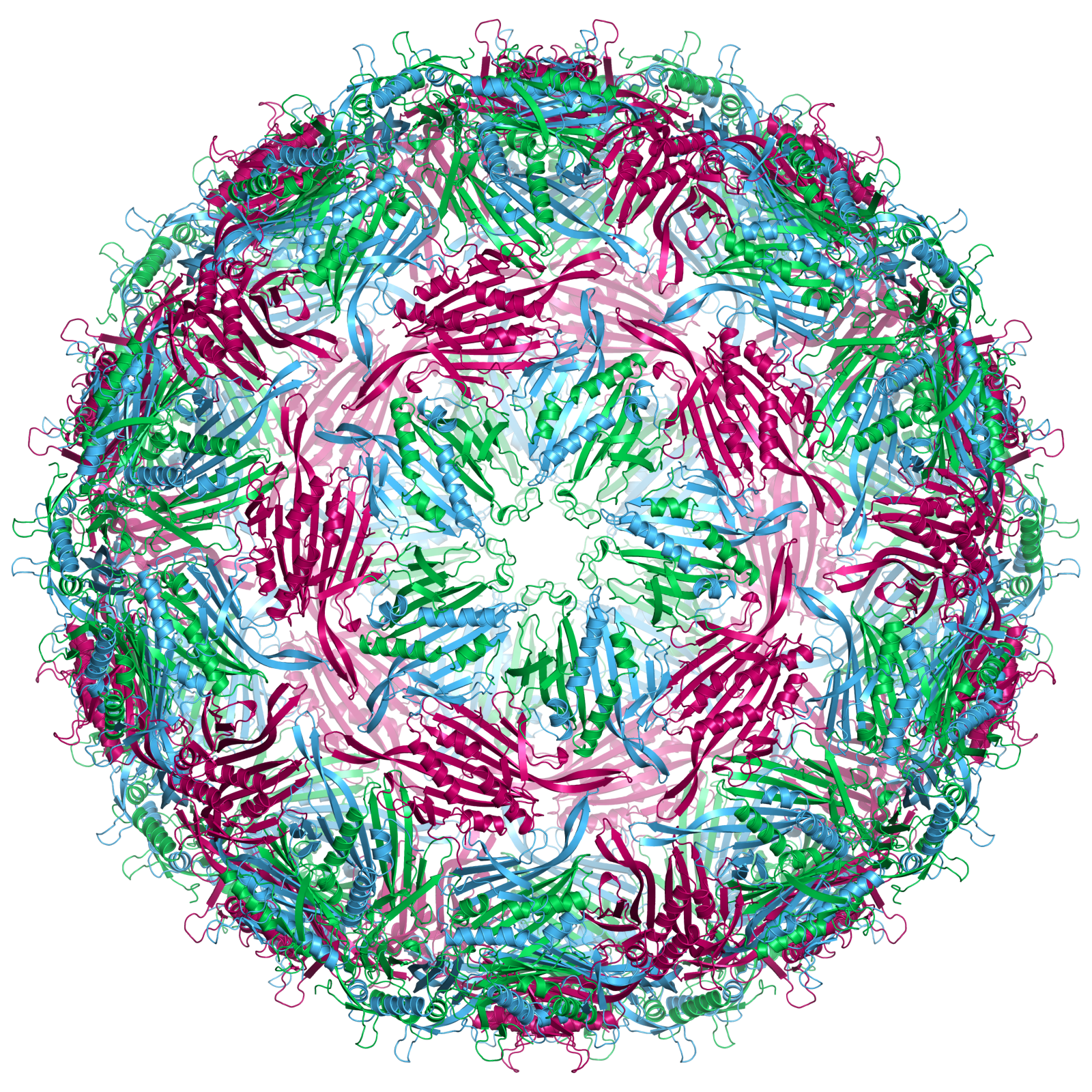
In 1972, the first gene was sequenced: the gene for bacteriophage MS2 coat protein (3 chains in different colours).

- 1972: Walter Fiers and his team were the first to determine the sequence of a gene: the gene for bacteriophage MS2 coat protein.
- 1976: Walter Fiers and his team determine the complete nucleotide-sequence of bacteriophage MS2-RNA.
- 1976: Yeast genes expressed in E. coli for the first time.
- 1977: DNA is sequenced for the first time by Fred Sanger, Walter Gilbert, and Allan Maxam working independently. Sanger's lab sequence the entire genome of bacteriophage Φ-X174.
- In the late 1970s: nonisotopic methods of nucleic acid labeling were developed. The subsequent improvements in the detection of reporter molecules using immunocytochemistry and immunofluorescence, in conjunction with advances in fluorescence microscopy and image analysis, have made the technique safer, faster and reliable.
- 1980: Paul Berg, Walter Gilbert and Frederick Sanger developed methods of mapping the structure of DNA. In 1972, recombinant DNA molecules were produced in Paul Berg's Stanford University laboratory. Berg was awarded the 1980 Nobel Prize in Chemistry for constructing recombinant DNA molecules that contained phage lambda genes inserted into the small circular DNA mol.
- 1980: Stanley Norman Cohen and Herbert Boyer received first U.S. patent for gene cloning, by proving the successful outcome of cloning a plasmid and expressing a foreign gene in bacteria to produce a "protein foreign to a unicellular organism." These two scientist were able to replicate proteins such as HGH, Erythropoietin and Insulin. The patent earned about $300 million in licensing royalties for Stanford.
- 1982: The U.S. Food and Drug Administration (FDA) approved the release of the first genetically engineered human insulin, originally biosynthesized using recombination DNA methods by Genentech in 1978. Once approved, the cloning process lead to mass production of humulin (under license by Eli Lilly & Co.).
- 1983: Kary Banks Mullis invents the polymerase chain reaction enabling the easy amplification of DNA.
- 1983: Barbara McClintock was awarded the Nobel Prize in Physiology or Medicine for her discovery of mobile genetic elements. McClintock studied transposon-mediated mutation and chromosome breakage in maize and published her first report in 1948 on transposable elements or transposons. She found that transposons were widely observed in corn, although her ideas weren't widely granted attention until the 1960s and 1970s when the same phenomenon was discovered in bacteria and Drosophila melanogaster.
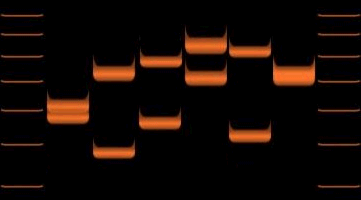
- Display of VNTR allele lengths on a chromatogram, a technology used in DNA fingerprinting
  1985: Alec Jeffreys announced DNA fingerprinting method. Jeffreys was studying DNA variation and the evolution of gene families in order to understand disease causing genes. In an attempt to develop a process to isolate many mini-satellites at once using chemical probes, Jeffreys took x-ray films of the DNA for examination and noticed that mini-satellite regions differ greatly from one person to another. In a DNA fingerprinting technique, a DNA sample is digested by treatment with specific nucleases or Restriction endonuclease and then the fragments are separated by electrophoresis producing a template distinct to each individual banding pattern of the gel.
- 1986: Jeremy Nathans found genes for color vision and color blindness, working with David Hogness, Douglas Vollrath and Ron Davis as they were studying the complexity of the retina.
- 1987: Yoshizumi Ishino discovers and describes part of a DNA sequence which later will be called CRISPR.
- 1989: Thomas Cech discovered that RNA can catalyze chemical reactions, making for one of the most important breakthroughs in molecular genetics, because it elucidates the true function of poorly understood segments of DNA.
- 1989: The human gene that encodes the CFTR protein was sequenced by Francis Collins and Lap-Chee Tsui. Defects in this gene cause cystic fibrosis.
- 1992: American and British scientists unveiled a technique for testing embryos in-vitro (Amniocentesis) for genetic abnormalities such as Cystic fibrosis and Hemophilia.
- 1993: Phillip Allen Sharp and Richard Roberts awarded the Nobel Prize for the discovery that genes in DNA are made up of introns and exons. According to their findings, not all the nucleotides on the RNA strand (product of DNA transcription) are used in the translation process. The intervening sequences in the RNA strand are first spliced out so that only the RNA segment left behind after splicing would be translated to polypeptides.
- 1994: The first breast cancer gene is discovered. BRCA I was discovered by researchers at the King laboratory at UC Berkeley in 1990 but was first cloned in 1994. BRCA II, the second key gene in the manifestation of breast cancer was discovered later in 1994 by Professor Michael Stratton and Dr. Richard Wooster.
- 1995: The genome of bacterium Haemophilus influenzae is the first genome of a free living organism to be sequenced.
- 1996: Saccharomyces cerevisiae, a yeast species, is the first eukaryote genome sequence to be released.
- 1996: Alexander Rich discovered the Z-DNA, a type of DNA which is in a transient state, that is in some cases associated with DNA transcription. The Z-DNA form is more likely to occur in regions of DNA rich in cytosine and guanine with high salt concentrations.
- 1997: Dolly the sheep was cloned by Ian Wilmut and colleagues from the Roslin Institute in Scotland.
- 1998: The first genome sequence for a multicellular eukaryote, Caenorhabditis elegans, is released.
- 2000: The full genome sequence of Drosophila melanogaster is completed.
- 2001: First draft sequences of the human genome are released simultaneously by the Human Genome Project and Celera Genomics.
- 2001: Francisco Mojica and Rudd Jansen propose the acronym CRISPR to describe a family of bacterial DNA sequences that can be used to specifically change genes within organisms.
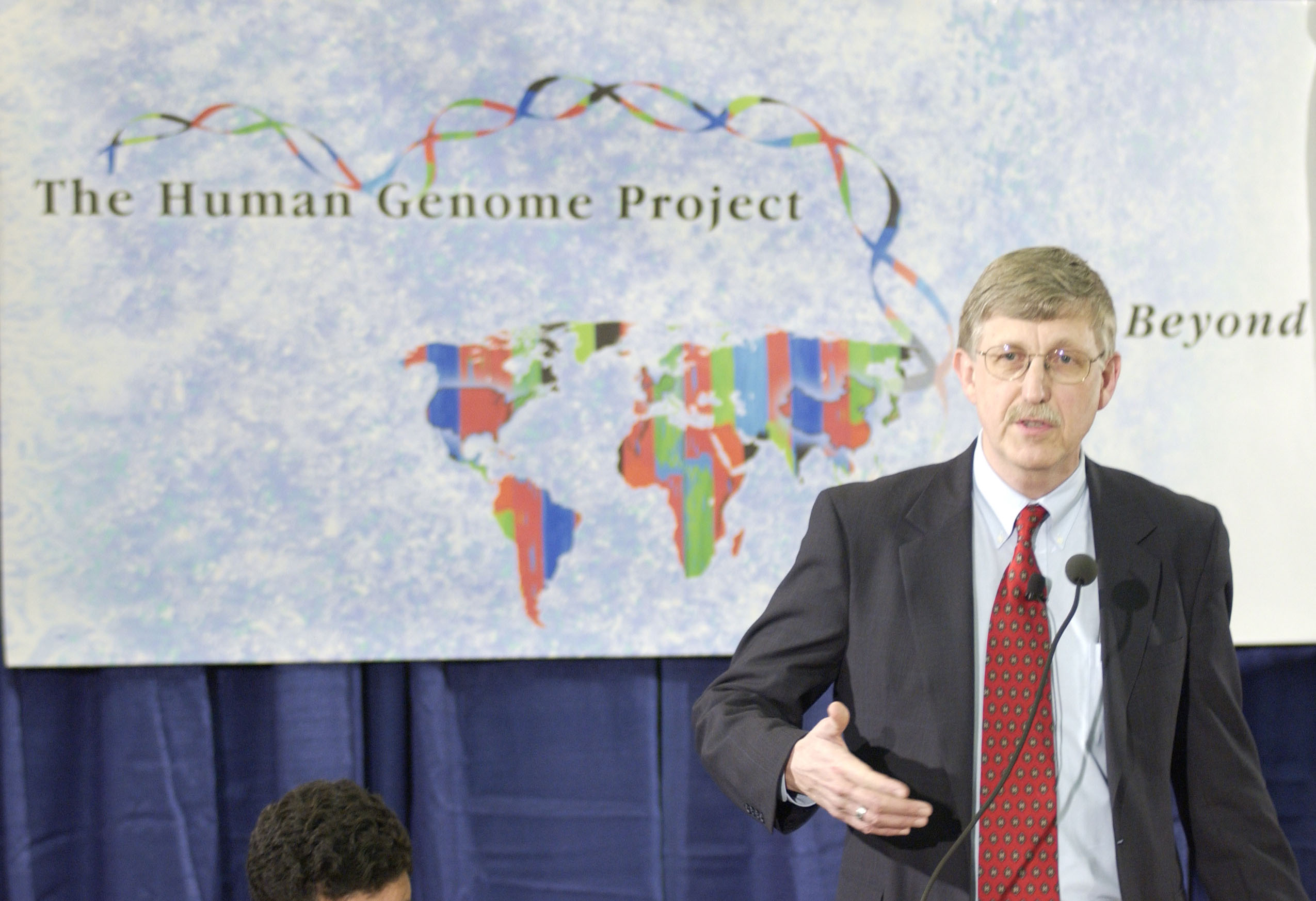
- Francis Collins announces the successful completion of the Human Genome Project in 2003
  2003: Successful completion of Human Genome Project with 99% of the genome sequenced to a 99.99% accuracy.
- 2003: Paul Hebert introduces the standardisation of molecular species identification and coins the term 'DNA Barcoding', proposing Cytochrome Oxidase 1 (CO1) as the DNA Barcode for Animals.
- 2004: Merck introduced a vaccine for Human Papillomavirus which promised to protect women against infection with HPV 16 and 18, which inactivates tumor suppressor genes and together cause 70% of cervical cancers.
- 2007: Michael Worobey traced the evolutionary origins of HIV by analyzing its genetic mutations, which revealed that HIV infections had occurred in the United States as early as the 1960s.
- 2007: Timothy Ray Brown becomes the first person cured from HIV/AIDS through a Hematopoietic stem cell transplantation.
- 2007: The Barcode of Life Data System (BOLD) is set up as an international reference library for molecular species identification.
- 2008: Houston-based Introgen developed Advexin (FDA Approval pending), the first gene therapy for cancer and Li-Fraumeni syndrome, utilizing a form of Adenovirus to carry a replacement gene coding for the p53 protein.
- 2009: The Consortium for the Barcode of Life Project (CBoL) Plant Working Group propose rbcL and matK as the duel barcode for land plants.
- 2010: Transcription activator-like effector nucleases (or TALENs) are first used to cut specific sequences of DNA.
- 2011: Fungal Barcoding Consortium propose Internal Transcribed Spacer region (ITS) as the Universal DNA Barcode for Fungi.
- 2012: The flora of Wales is completely barcoded, and reference specimens stored in the BOLD systems database, by the National Botanic Garden of Wales.
- 2016: A genome is sequenced in outer space for the first time, with NASA astronaut Kate Rubins using a MinION device aboard the International Space Station.

== See also ==
- DNA: The Story of Life
- Timeline of biotechnology
