= Jeremy Reiter =

American developmental geneticist

- Born: Cincinnati, Ohio, United States of America
- Education: Yale College; University of California, San Francisco
- Scientific career
- Fields: Development; Genetics
- Workplaces: University of California San Francisco (2003-present)
- Doctoral advisor: Didier Stainier
- Other academic advisors: William Skarnes

Jeremy Reiter is an American developmental geneticist who is a Professor in the Department of Biochemistry and Biophysics at the University of California, San Francisco (UCSF). He is holder of the Albert Bowers Endowed Chair. His research focuses on the cilium, particularly in understanding its role in cell signaling and its involvement in human diseases such as cancer, congenital disorders and obesity.

== Early life and education ==
Reiter was born in Cincinnati, Ohio, received his undergraduate degree from Yale University, where he studied molecular biology and biophysics and spent time doing research on Hepatitis E at the Pasteur Institute of Dakar. Following his time at Yale, Reiter pursued medical and doctoral studies at UCSF, receiving both an M.D. and a Ph.D. His doctoral work with Didier Stainier investigated the developmental biology of zebrafish heart and endoderm development, with a focus on GATA transcription factors. He did postdoctoral studies with William Skarnes, identifying novel secreted factors required for mammalian embryogenesis.

== Career ==
After completing his postdoctoral fellowship in 2003, Reiter became a UCSF Fellow in the Diabetes Center at UCSF and then, in 2006, a professor at UCSF in the Department of Biochemistry and Biophysics. From 2013 to 2017, he co-directed the UCSF Developmental and Stem Cell Biology graduate program. He became chair of his department in 2017.

=== Research contributions ===
Reiter's research lab has investigated ciliary biology, elucidating the complex processes by which cilia are built, compartmentalized and function as cellular signaling antennae. Reiter lab contributions include discovering that components of the vertebrate Hedgehog signal transduction pathway operate at the primary cilium, that cancer cells can be ciliated and that cancers can require cilia for growth, and that the ciliary and plasma membrane, despite being contiguous, are composed of distinct lipids. His lab has also been instrumental at identifying the protein components of a region at the base of the cilium called the transition zone, showing that the transition zone is a gate that controls ciliary composition, and discovering that some ciliopathies are caused by inherited human mutations in these transition zone components. Together with the laboratory of Christian Vaisse, the Reiter lab has discovered how cilia of hypothalamic neurons cue satiety. Recently, the Reiter lab has identified GPCRs that localize to and function at cilia. The study of ciliary GPCRs has helped reveal how similar receptors at the ciliary membrane and plasma membrane communicate different information. Reiter's work has advanced the understanding of how cilia participate in intercellular communication and how ciliary defects lead to a range of diseases known as ciliopathies, which can affect multiple systems in the human body, including the nervous system, limbs and kidneys.

As chair of the Department of Biochemistry and Biophysics at UCSF, Reiter has been instrumental in shaping the research direction of the department, emphasizing interdisciplinary approaches, collaboration and curiosity-driven research. He has recruited several new faculties, including David Booth and Hanna Martens, and established new endowed chairs.

== Awards and honors ==
Reiter has received the March of Dimes Basil O’Connor Research Award, the Burroughs-Wellcome Foundation Career Awards in the Biomedical Sciences, and the David and Lucile Packard Foundation Fellowship for Science and Engineering. In addition, he received a Presidential Early Career Award for Scientists and Engineers (PECASE) in 2008, was elected to the American Society for Clinical Investigation (ASCI) in 2010, was awarded the American Association for Anatomy R. R. Bensley Award in Cell Biology in 2012, the Society for Endocrinology Journal of Molecular Endocrinology Award in 2014, and the ARCS Foundation Distinguished Scholar Alumni Award in 2017.
