= Didier Stainier =

Belgian-American developmental geneticist (born 1963)

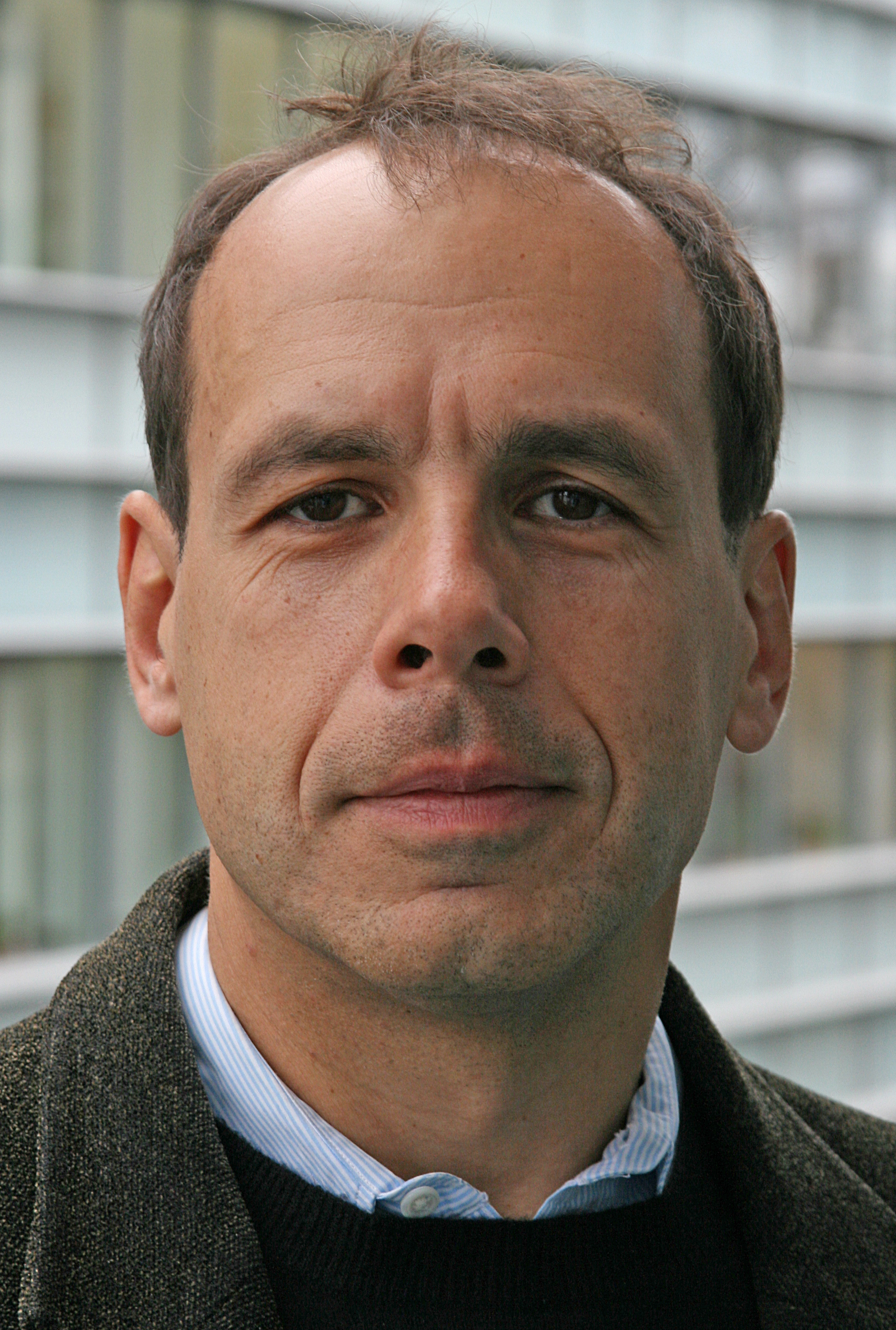
- Born: 1963 (age 62–63); Liège, Belgium
- Education: Brandeis University (BA); Harvard University (PhD)
- Awards: Member of EMBO (2016); Christiane Nüsslein-Volhard Award (2017)
- Scientific career
- Fields: Development; Genetics
- Workplaces: University of California San Francisco (1995-2012); Max Planck Institute for Heart and Lung Research (2012-present)
- Doctoral advisor: Walter Gilbert
- Other academic advisors: Mark Fishman

Didier Stainier (born 1963) is a Belgian/American developmental geneticist who is currently a director at the Max Planck Institute for Heart and Lung Research in Bad Nauheim, Germany.

== Scientific career ==
Didier Stainier studied biology in Wales (United World College of the Atlantic), Belgium (University of Liège) and the USA (Brandeis University) where he got a BA in 1984. He has a PhD in biochemistry and biophysics from Harvard University (1990). During his PhD work, he investigated axon guidance and target recognition in the developing mouse with Walter Gilbert. Subsequently, he initiated the studies on zebrafish cardiac development as a Helen Hay Whitney postdoctoral fellow with Mark Fishman at the Massachusetts General Hospital (Boston).

=== Scientific interests ===
Together with the many students and postdocs in his laboratory, Stainier helped pioneer the use of the zebrafish model to study a wide range of questions pertaining to vertebrate organ development and function, and has published extensively. His forward genetic analyses of heart development revealed the unexpected role of several signaling pathways including sphingosine 1-phosphate signaling and the discovery of the long-elusive sphingosine 1-phosphate transporter. Additional genetic screens led to the elucidation of transcriptional networks regulating endoderm formation and endothelial cell specification as well as extracellular signals regulating liver induction. He pushed the frontiers of in vivo microscopy to reveal new insights into cardiac valve formation and cardiac trabeculation, and used cellular approaches to gain a detailed understanding of these processes. Stainier developed and used single-cell analyses to provide the first in vivo demonstration of the hemangioblast, a formerly hypothetical cell that gives rise to both endothelial and blood cells, as well as the discovery of a new mode of blood vessel formation. His studies on gut looping morphogenesis revealed the importance of tissue-level physical forces in shaping organs, and his studies on gut lumen formation revealed the importance of fluid flow in this process. He developed a number of cell ablation models that allowed him and others to gain new insights into the process of organ regeneration, with potential implications for novel disease therapies. Most recently, he has also made significant contributions to the understanding of genetic compensation.

== Selected awards and honors ==
- Wien International Scholar, Brandeis University 1982–1984
- Helen Hay Whitney Foundation Postdoctoral Fellow 1991-1994
- Packard Foundation Fellow in Science and Engineering 1995-2000
- Established Investigator, American Heart Association 2000–2003
- Mossman Award in Developmental Biology, American Association of Anatomists 2002
- Annual Byers Award in Basic Science, UCSF 2003–2004
- Outstanding Faculty Mentorship Award, UCSF 2003
- NIH DEV1, study section founding Chair 2003–2006
- Elected Fellow of the American Association for the Advancement of Science 2008
- Officier dans l'ordre de Léopold de Belgique 2013
- European Research Council (ERC) Advanced Grant 2015
- Elected Member of European Molecular Biology Organization (EMBO) 2016
- Elected Member of Academia Europaea 2016
- Christiane Nüsslein-Volhard Award (European Zebrafish Society) 2017
- President, International Zebrafish Society (IZFS) 2020
- European Research Council (ERC) Advanced Grant 2020

== Interviews ==
- Sedwick, Caitlin (2013). "Didier Stainier: How function follows form". The Journal of Cell Biology. 202 (1): 4–5. doi:10.1083/jcb.2021pi. PMC 3704995. PMID 23836925.
- Grewal, S (2015). "An interview with Didier Stainier". Development. 142 (17): 2861–3. doi:10.1242/dev.128769. PMID 26329596.

== Videos ==
- iBiology Seminar Part I: Vertebrate Organ Development: The Zebrafish Heart
- iBiology Seminar Part II: Cardiac Trabeculation
- iBiology Seminar Part III: Genetic Compensation
- Positional cloning of cloche, a gene that drives endothelial and hematopoietic lineage specification. (Genetics Society of America)
- Curing Diabetes One Fish at a Time: The Long Road of Translational Research. (NIH Wednesday Afternoon Lecture Series)
