= Benno Müller-Hill =

German biologist and author (1933–2018)

Benno Müller-Hill (5 February 1933 – 11 August 2018) was a German biologist and author. Together with Walter Gilbert, Müller-Hill purified the lac repressor, the first genetic control protein to be isolated.

Müller-Hill has lectured widely and written books on the misuse of science by the Nazis.

He was a professor of Genetics at the University of Cologne.

He wrote several journal articles including 'Genetics of susceptibility to tuberculosis: Mengele's experiments in Auschwitz' (2001) and 'The blood from Auschwitz and the silence of the scholars' (1999).

He also wrote Murderous Science: Elimination by Scientific Selection of Jews, Gypsies, and Others, Germany 1933-1945. It "is a devastating indictment of the role German scientists played in Nazi atrocities. It reveals how prominent scholars and physicians—many of whom were active in the international eugenics movement—not only acquiesced to anti-Semitic laws and extermination camps, but provided a scientific foundation for Hitler's racist policies, advised on the laws that were passed to implement these policies, helped administrate the Final Solution as well as euthanasia programs aimed at the mentally ill, and in extreme cases, such as Dr. Mengele at Auschwitz, personally murdered inmates "in the interests of science."

A video of him discusses genetics and eugenics can be found on the United States Holocaust Memorial Museum website. The DNA learning center website also includes a video where Gilbert and Müller-Hill discussed "what happened to Nazi doctors after the war and what can be learned from Hitler's attempt to make a perfect race."
