= Helen Donis-Keller =

Biology and art professor

Helen R. Donis-Keller
- Education: Lakehead University; Harvard University
- Scientific career
- Workplaces: Biogen; Collaborative Research; Washington University in St. Louis; Olin College
- Thesis: Enzymatic RNA sequencing and fractionation methods (1979)
- Doctoral advisor: Walter Gilbert

Helen Donis-Keller is the Michael E. Moody professor and professor of biology and art at Olin College in Needham, Massachusetts. Originally working as a graphic designer for Lakehead University, her interest in science began after enrolling in biology and chemistry classes at the university for fun.

== Education and career ==
Donis-Keller has a B.Sc. and an H.B.Sc. from Lakehead University. She earned her Ph.D. at Harvard University under the direction of Walter Gilbert in 1979. After employment at the biotechnology companies Biogen and Collaborative Research (now Genome Therapeutics Corporation), she joined the faculty at Washington University School of Medicine. In 2001, she earn an MFA in studio art from the School of the Museum of Fine Arts in Boston and Tufts University and she joined the faculty at the Olin College of Engineering. In 2012, she was named the Michael. E. Moody Faculty Chair.

== Research ==
Donis-Keller's graduate research established a method to do RNA sequencing. During her time at Collaborative Research, her research group created the first genetic map of the human genome. Donis-Keller was unable to secure either NIH or venture funding for generating the RFLP map, but convinced Collaborative Research's management to fund the project. She continued to work on the genetic linkage map and led research into understanding the genetic basis of cystic fibrosis, thyroid cancer, and breast cancer.

=== Selected publications ===
- Donis-Keller, Helen; Maxam, Allan M.; Gilbert, Walter (1977). "Mapping adenines, guanines, and pyrimidines in RNA". Nucleic Acids Research. 4 (8): 2527–2538. doi:10.1093/nar/4.8.2527. ISSN 0305-1048. PMC 342589. PMID 409999.
- Doniskeller, H (October 1987). "A genetic linkage map of the human genome". Cell. 51 (2): 319–337. doi:10.1016/0092-8674(87)90158-9. ISSN 0092-8674. PMID 3664638. S2CID 7230640.
- Donis-Keller, Helen; Dou, Shenshen; Chi, David; Carlson, Katrin M.; Toshima, Koji; Lairmore, Terry C.; Howe, James R.; Moley, Jeffrey F.; Goodfellow, Paul; Wells, Samuel A. (1993). "Mutations in the RET proto-oncogene are associated with MEN 2A and FMTC". Human Molecular Genetics. 2 (7): 851–856. doi:10.1093/hmg/2.7.851. ISSN 0964-6906. PMID 8103403.

== Awards ==
- Doctor of Science Degree (Honoris Causa) from Lakehead University (1995)
- 2023 Fellow of the American Association for the Advancement of Science

== Art ==
In addition to teaching art at Olin, Donis-Keller is herself an artist, and her art can be seen at Needham's 2021 Open Studios event and other venues. Her Ph.D. advisor, Walter Gilbert, has also begun to investigate the intersection between art and science though, in a 2015 interview, Donis-Keller did not recall his interest in art while she was a student in his lab.
