= Genome Therapeutics Corporation =

Genome Therapeutics Corp. was an early biotech company. It was founded in 1961 by Orrie M. Friedman under the name Collaborative Research Inc. Under the leadership of Helen Donis-Keller and using internal funds, the company produced one of the first linkage maps of the whole human genome in the mid-1980s.

The name was later changed its name to Genome Therapeutics. In 1994, it produced the first commercial genome sequence, that of Helicobacter pylori, the pathogen responsible for peptic ulcers. The rights to the genome were sold to Astra AB of Sweden for $22 million and a similar deal struck with Schering-Plough. In addition to infectious agents, it also worked on heritable diseases including asthma.

In 2004, Genome Therapeutics changed its name to Oscient Pharmaceuticals and its sequencing division joined with Agencourt Bioscience. The latter spun out Agencourt Personal Genomics which was acquired by ABI for $120 million in 2007.
