= Aristides Patrinos =

American scientist and engineer

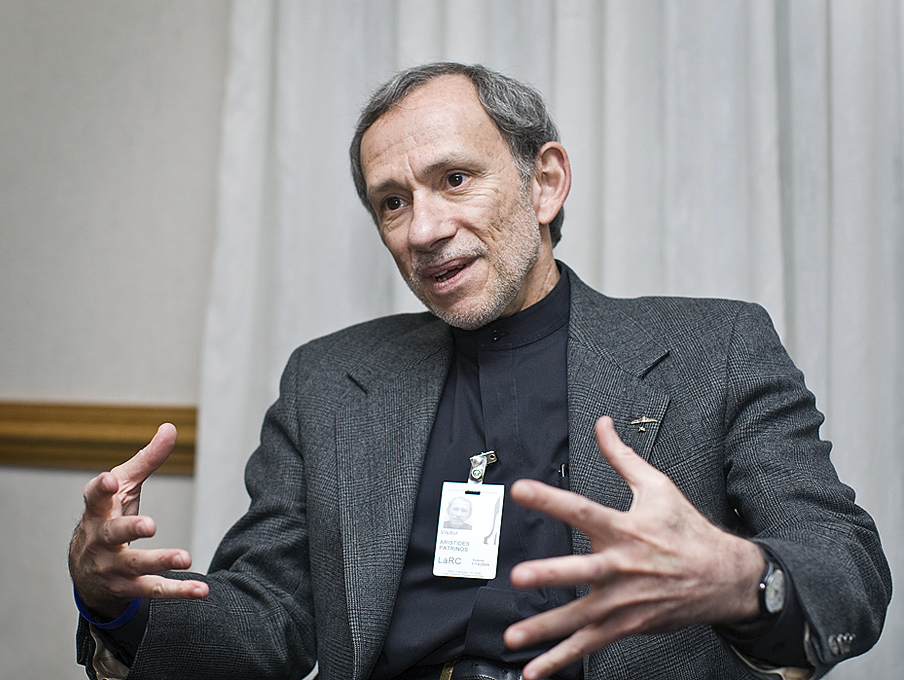
- Born: Alexandria, Egypt
- Education: National Technical University of Athens
- Known for: Human Genome Project
- Scientific career
- Fields: Genomics, mechanical, chemical, and biological engineering, structural biology
- Workplaces: NYU

Dr. Aristides Patrinos (Greek: Αριστείδης Πατρινός) is an expert in synthetic biology, and a former leader of the Human Genome Project.

== Biography ==
Patrinos was born in 1947 to parents of Greek ancestry in Alexandria, Egypt. After attending and graduating from Greek and British schools, in 1965 he left Cairo and moved to Athens, Greece. He studied engineering, both electrical and mechanical, at the National Technical University of Athens. Upon receiving his degree in 1970, he moved to the U.S. and studied in Chicago, Illinois at Northwestern University. In 1975, after receiving his Ph.D, he moved to New York State and taught at the University of Rochester. From there he worked with the Department of Energy and their national laboratories in New York state and Tennessee, eventually settling in Washington D.C., where he joined the U. S. Department of Energy full time. He is married to Kathryn Hoff and they have two daughters.

== Career ==
In 1993, Patrinos succeeded David J. Galas as the Director of the Office of Biological and Environmental Research in the U.S. Department of Energy, where he worked on the Human Genome Project. He launched the Genomes to Life Program and created the DOE Joint Genome Institute. At DOE he was also involved in initiating the International Panel on Climate Change and the Global Change Research Program within the Department of Energy. His work and research has defined many of the policies the United States employs with regard to these fields.

He left the Department of Energy in 2006, and joined Synthetic Genomics Inc.

Patrinos is considered a leading authority on structural biology, genomics, global environmental change, and nuclear medicine. He currently directs research for Urban Sciences and Progress or the CUSP program, and is also a professor of biological, chemical, and mechanical engineering at New York University. He continues to be involved with Synthetic Genome and their project, and also serves on the Board of Directors of Tsakos Energy and Navigation (TNP). He also continues work in Washington D.C. advocating solutions for sustainable global energy and environmental change.

== Awards ==
Patrinos has received two Secretary's Gold Honor awards from the Department of Energy, and three Presidential Rank Awards, and several honorary degrees.
