= Mark Skolnick =

American scientist and businessman (born 1946)

- Born: Mark Henry Skolnick; January 28, 1946 (age 80); Temple, Texas
- Education: UC Berkeley, Stanford University (PhD 1975)
- Known for: Restriction fragment length polymorphism (RFLP)
- Scientific career
- Fields: Economics, genetics
- Workplaces: University of Utah, Myriad Genetics

Mark Henry Skolnick (born January 28, 1946) is an American geneticist and the founder of Myriad Genetics Inc, an American molecular diagnostic company based in Salt Lake City, Utah. His most cited paper is "Construction of a genetic linkage map in man using restriction fragment length polymorphisms" at 14901 times, according to Google Scholar.

== Early life and education ==
He was born in 1946 in Temple, Texas, and earned his B.A. at University of California at Berkeley in 1968 and a Ph.D at Stanford University in 1975. His father taught a clinical post graduate course in psychoanalysis at Stanford, where Skolnick was introduced to the bright Stanford academics at a very young age. “It got put into my head pretty early on that medicine was interesting,” says Skolnick, “but it might be more interesting to be an academic than a doctor. I’m not sure I would have wanted to just focus on seeing ill people.” Skolnick was very good at math but his parents also played a very significant role cultivating his interest in science and in societal causes. “I think I was driven a lot by actually wanting to do something of lasting social significance,” he said. At the age of fourteen he wanted to be a world health doctor, although his early talents were most visible in mathematics.

He studied economics at the University of California, Berkeley, focusing on demography and anthropology. He was mostly interested in quantitative problems. He continued his graduate studies in demography in the same university and his ambition was to link these fields with genetics, studying individuals in a population, rather than large population trends. As he says, “The way you study individuals is in pedigrees, by linking fertility, mortality, migration-parameters for single individuals.”

He received his PhD from Stanford University in 1975. He then moved to the University of Utah where he began working in collaboration with the Departments of Medical Informatics, Biology, Cardiology and Genetics.

He directed the group that cloned the breast cancer susceptibility gene, BRCA1; found the full-length sequence of BRCA2.

== Discovery of BRCAl and BRCA2 genes ==
Connecting Demography with Genetics: According to Skolnick, "the first scientific step in my search of the BRCA gene arose from my interest in demography, the study of human populations. The standard wisdom in the 1960s was that this was small field that should be studied within the contrast of sociology or economics." He used the demography and applied to genetics and studied individuals in multi-generational families.

Secondly, he was instrumental in forming a familial cancer screening clinic. Skolnick and his colleagues used this clinic to study a number of people in different families with different types of cancers. As Skolnick states, “ This resources was a key to our success” in finding the BRCA genes.

Finally, Skolnick and his group developed a method called Restriction Fragment Length Polymorphisms (RFLPs) for genetic mapping which was also a significant resource for human genome project. After that point on his group focused on this technique and started to map and clone genes that caused diseases. The first gene they cloned successfully using this RFLPs was of Alport syndrome. This technique was one of many later used for the discovery of BRCA.

== Awards ==
- Skolnick was elected a Fellow of the American Medical Informatics Association in 1990.
- In 1994, The New York Times acknowledged him as "leader of the team that successfully identified the gene for breast cancer." Said The New York Times: "No one is more surprised and gratified than Dr. Mark H. Skolnick of the University of Utah, whose team plucked the gene from a crowded stretch of chromosome 17 and out of the grasp of 12 other teams that had thrown hats and hopes into the ring."
