= Mark Fishman =

American cardiologist

- Citizenship: United States
- Education: Yale College, Harvard Medical School
- Known for: pioneering Zebrafish research in cardiology
- Awards: Institute of Medicine member, Fellow of the American Academy of Arts and Sciences
- Scientific career
- Fields: Medicine, Cardiology
- Workplaces: Novartis Institutes of BioMedical Research, Massachusetts General Hospital, Harvard Medical School

Mark Fishman is an American cardiologist, a professor in the Harvard Department of Stem Cell and Regenerative Biology and Chief of the Pathways Clinical Service service at the Massachusetts General Hospital for patients with complex medical disorders. A researcher and clinician in cardiology, he is the previous president of the Novartis Institutes for BioMedical Research (NIBR), the main research arm of Novartis Pharmaceuticals.

Fishman was appointed president of the newly founded Novartis Institutes for BioMedical Research in 2002 to implement a new strategy in Novartis' global drug discovery effort. He is the author of over 100 publications and known for pioneering research using the zebrafish as a means of visualizing the development of the circulatory system and as a model for human disease.

== Education ==
- B.A. Yale College, 1972
- M.D. Harvard Medical School, 1976

== Career ==
He was previously a professor of medicine at Harvard Medical School, chief of cardiology at Massachusetts General Hospital, and director of the Cardiovascular Research Center at Massachusetts General Hospital. He is a fellow of the National Academy of Arts and Sciences and a member of the National Academy of Sciences, Institute of Medicine.

After being the head of Novartis’ research operation for 13 years, he decided to retire in 2016 and became professor at Harvard and Chief at MGH
