= Maxam–Gilbert sequencing =

Method of DNA sequencing

Maxam–Gilbert sequencing is a method of DNA sequencing developed by Allan Maxam and Walter Gilbert in 1976–1977. This method is based on nucleobase-specific partial chemical modification of DNA and subsequent cleavage of the DNA backbone at sites adjacent to the modified nucleotides.

An example Maxam–Gilbert sequencing reaction. Cleaving the same tagged segment of DNA at different points yields tagged fragments of different sizes. The fragments may then be separated by gel electrophoresis.

Maxam–Gilbert sequencing was the first widely adopted method for DNA sequencing, and, along with the Sanger dideoxy method, represents the first generation of DNA sequencing methods. Maxam–Gilbert sequencing is no longer in widespread use, having been supplanted by next-generation sequencing methods.

== History ==
Although Maxam and Gilbert published their chemical sequencing method two years after Frederick Sanger and Alan Coulson published their work on plus-minus sequencing, Maxam–Gilbert sequencing rapidly became more popular, since purified DNA could be used directly, while the initial Sanger method required that each read start be cloned for production of single-stranded DNA. However, with the improvement of the chain-termination method (see below), Maxam–Gilbert sequencing has fallen out of favour due to its technical complexity prohibiting its use in standard molecular biology kits, extensive use of hazardous chemicals, and difficulties with scale-up.

Allan Maxam and Walter Gilbert’s 1977 paper “A new method for sequencing DNA” was honored by a Citation for Chemical Breakthrough Award from the Division of History of Chemistry of the American Chemical Society for 2017. It was presented to the Department of Molecular & Cellular Biology, Harvard University.

== Procedure ==
Maxam–Gilbert sequencing requires radioactive labeling at one 5′ end of the DNA fragment to be sequenced (typically by a kinase reaction using gamma-^{32}P ATP) and purification of the DNA. Chemical treatment generates breaks at a small proportion of one or two of the four nucleotide bases in each of four reactions (G, A+G, C, C+T). For example, the purines (A+G) are depurinated using formic acid, the guanines (and to some extent the adenines) are methylated by dimethyl sulfate, and the pyrimidines (C+T) are hydrolysed using hydrazine. The addition of salt (sodium chloride) to the hydrazine reaction inhibits the reaction of thymine for the C-only reaction. The modified DNAs may then be cleaved by hot piperidine; (CH_{2})_{5}NH at the position of the modified base. The concentration of the modifying chemicals is controlled to introduce on average one modification per DNA molecule. Thus a series of labeled fragments is generated, from the radiolabeled end to the first "cut" site in each molecule.

The fragments in the four reactions are electrophoresed side by side in denaturing acrylamide gels for size separation. To visualize the fragments, the gel is exposed to X-ray film for autoradiography, yielding a series of dark bands each showing the location of identical radiolabeled DNA molecules. From presence and absence of certain fragments the sequence may be inferred.

== Related methods ==
This method led to the Methylation Interference Assay, used to map DNA-binding sites for DNA-binding proteins.

An automated Maxam–Gilbert sequencing protocol was developed in 1994.

== See also ==
- Sanger sequencing
