= Myriad Genetics =

American biotechnology company

Myriad Genetics, Inc.
- Type: Public
- Traded as: Nasdaq: MYGN
- Industry: Healthcare; Molecular Diagnostics; Biotechnology; Precision Medicine
- Founded: 1991; 35 years ago, in Salt Lake City, Utah, United States
- Founder: Mark Skolnick; Peter Meldrum; Kevin Kimberlin
- Headquarters: Salt Lake City, Utah
- Key people: Sam Raha (president and CEO)
- Revenue: ▲$690.6 million (2021)
- Number of employees: 2,600
- Website: myriad.com

Myriad Genetics, Inc. is an American genetic testing company based in Salt Lake City, Utah, United States. Myriad uses proprietary technologies to genetically evaluate the onset, progression and treatment of disease. This information is used to guide the development of products that assess an individual's risk for developing disease later in life (predictive medicine), identify a patient's likelihood of responding to a particular drug therapy, and assess a patient's risk of disease progression and disease recurrence (precision medicine). The company was founded in 1991.

== History ==
The search for the genetic basis of breast cancer began when Mary-Claire King from the University of California, Berkeley announced the localization through linkage analysis of a gene associated with increased risk for breast cancer (BRCA1) to the long arm of chromosome 17. To further locate the specific gene, Mark Skolnick and his colleagues invented a gene mapping technique known as Restriction fragment length polymorphism (RFLP). Kimberlin and others formed Myriad Genetics in 1991.

In August 1994, researchers at Myriad, the University of Utah, the U.S. National Institutes of Health (NIH), and McGill University sequenced BRCA1. They attempted to patent this gene, which eventually resulted the US Supreme Court ruling in Association for Molecular Pathology v. Myriad Genetics, Inc. (2012) that a naturally occurring DNA sequence cannot be patented.

The firm established the first clinical laboratory to commercialize genomic testing. Myriad created the first test to measure the molecular biology and aggressiveness of men's prostate cancer, devised a method to assess the inherited breast cancer risk of any woman not previously diagnosed with breast cancer, commercialized a psychotropic test that covers 61 medications commonly prescribed for depression, anxiety, ADHD.

=== Acquisitions and subsidiaries ===
In August 2016, Myriad announced it would acquire Assurex Health for up to $410 million, expanding the company's genetic testing for psychotropic medicine selection.

In July 2018, Myriad completed an acquisition of reproductive genetic testing firm Counsyl for $375 million, expanding the company's testing capabilities to carrier and prenatal screening.

Other subsidiaries of Myriad Genetics include Myriad International and Myriad Autoimmune (aka Crescendo Bioscience).

=== Founders ===
The founders of Myriad are Peter Meldrum (past President and CEO of Agridyne and past CEO and President of Myriad Genetics, Inc.) and Mark Skolnick (Adjunct Professor in the Department of Medical Informatics at the University of Utah).

== Products ==
Among the prognostic tests developed and marketed by Myriad is "Prolaris", which uses gene expression profiling to provide a 10-year prostate cancer-specific risk of death. Another prognostic test, marketed as "myRisk Hereditary Cancer", reviews genetic markers correlated with elevated risk of developing any of eleven hereditary cancers.

== Controversies ==
Myriad Genetics's patents on human genes became quite controversial. Following the discovery by Mary-Claire King that a gene on chromosome 17 is associated with an increased risk of breast cancer, Myriad attempted to patent this gene. These patents were the subject of scrutiny after Myriad became involved in a lawsuit over its patenting practices, which led to the landmark Supreme Court decision Association for Molecular Pathology v. Myriad Genetics, Inc. which ruled these patents illegal. Because genes occur naturally in every human, in addition to raising moral questions, some believe that patents constitute an obstacle to biomedical research worldwide. Additionally, the discovery of their relevance to breast cancer was funded by the public.

=== Patent lawsuits ===
In 2010–2013 Myriad Genetics was a defendant in the case Association for Molecular Pathology v. Myriad Genetics (formerly Association For Molecular Pathology et al. v. United States Patent and Trademark Office). Lawyers at the ACLU served as counsel for the plaintiffs. In the suit, medical associations, doctors, and patients sued Myriad Genetics to challenge seven United States patents on genes related to breast cancer and ovarian cancer.

Two of the company's patents on the BRCA1 and BRCA2 genes, which are inherited gene mutations that link to around half of the 5%–10% of inherited gene mutating breast cancer cases in the US^{[27]}, were ruled invalid on March 29, 2010, by Judge Robert W. Sweet in the U.S. District Court for the Southern District of New York. On appeal, the Court of Appeals for the Federal Circuit reversed the trial court in an opinion dated July 29, 2011 and held that the genes were eligible for patents. On December 7, 2011, the ACLU filed a petition for a writ of certiorari to the Supreme Court. On March 26, 2012, the Supreme Court vacated the Federal Circuit's judgment and remanded the case for further consideration in light of Mayo Collaborative Services v. Prometheus Laboratories, Inc., in which the Supreme Court had ruled, just six days earlier, that more restrictive rules were required to patent observations about natural phenomena.

On August 16, 2012, the Federal Circuit reaffirmed Myriad's right to patent the genes (because isolated genes are different from their natural state, using its own precedent in Amgen v. Chugai Pharmaceutical), although they denied patent claims on methods comprising comparison of DNA sequences, as unpatentable "mental acts". On November 30, 2012, the Supreme Court agreed to hear a second challenge to the two gene patents held by Myriad. Oral argument took place on April 15, 2013. On June 13, 2013, in Association for Molecular Pathology v. Myriad Genetics (No. 12-398), the US Supreme Court unanimously ruled that "A naturally occurring DNA segment is a product of nature and not patent eligible merely because it has been isolated", invalidating Myriad's patents on the BRCA1 and BRCA2 genes. However, the Court also held that manipulation of a gene to create something not found in nature—such as a strand of synthetically-produced complementary DNA (cDNA)—could still be eligible for patent protection.

Myriad Genetics has also been involved in litigation in Australia over the patentability of DNA sequences (D'Arcy v Myriad Genetics Inc (2015)). Regarding BRCA1, the company succeeded in the Federal Court, both at first instance and on appeal to the full court, but in October 2015 lost in a unanimous decision of the High Court, D'Arcy v Myriad Genetics Inc.

== See also ==
- Biological patents in the United States
