= Walter Gilbert =

American biochemist, physicist and Nobel laureate (born 1932)

Walter Gilbert ForMemRS
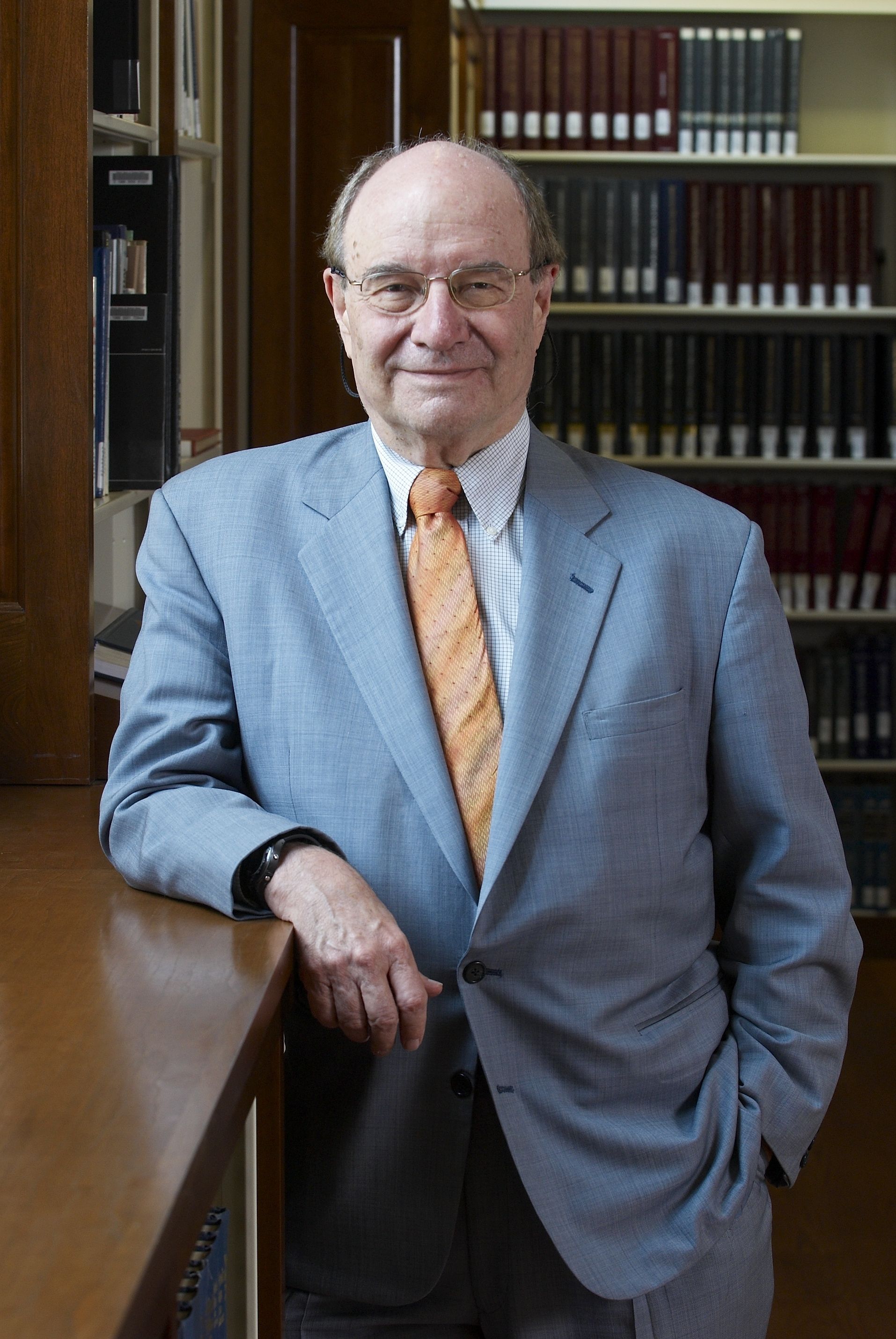
- Walter Gilbert in 2008
- Born: March 21, 1932 (age 94); Boston, Massachusetts, U.S.
- Education: Harvard University (BA, MA); University of Cambridge (PhD)
- Known for: DNA sequencing
- Spouse: Celia Stone (m. 1953)
- Children: 2
- Awards: NAS Award in Molecular Biology (1968); Louisa Gross Horwitz Prize (1979); Nobel Prize in Chemistry (1980)
- Scientific career
- Fields: Biochemistry; Physics
- Workplaces: Harvard University
- Thesis: On generalised dispersion relations and meson-nucleon scattering (1958)
- Doctoral advisor: Abdus Salam
- Doctoral students: Benno Müller-Hill; Didier Stainier; George M. Church; Gerald Guralnik; Helen Donis-Keller; Jack Greenblatt
- Website: www.nobelprize.org/nobel_prizes/chemistry/laureates/1980/gilbert-bio.html

Walter Gilbert (born March 21, 1932) is an American biochemist, physicist, molecular biology pioneer, and Nobel laureate.

== Education and early life ==
Walter Gilbert was born in Boston, Massachusetts, on March 21, 1932, into a Jewish family, the son of Emma (Cohen), a child psychologist, and Richard V. Gilbert, an economist.

When Gilbert was seven years old, the family moved to the Washington D.C. area so his father could work under Harry Hopkins on the New Deal brain trust. While living in Washington the family became friends with the family of I.F. Stone and Wally met Stone's oldest daughter, Celia, when they were both 8. They later married at age 21.

He was educated at the Sidwell Friends School, and attended Harvard University for undergraduate and graduate studies, earning a baccalaureate in chemistry and physics in 1953 and a master's degree in physics in 1954. He studied for his doctorate at the University of Cambridge, where he earned a PhD in physics supervised by the Nobel laureate Abdus Salam in 1957.

== Career and research ==
Gilbert returned to Harvard in 1956 and was appointed assistant professor of physics in 1959. Gilbert's wife Celia worked for James Watson, leading Gilbert to become interested in molecular biology. Watson and Gilbert ran their laboratory jointly through most of the 1960s, until Watson left for Cold Spring Harbor Laboratory. In 1964 he was promoted to associate professor of biophysics and promoted again in 1968 to professor of biochemistry.

Gilbert is a co-founder of the biotech start-up companies Biogen, with Kenneth Murray, Phillip Sharp and Charles Weissman and Myriad Genetics with Dr. Mark Skolnick and Kevin Kimberlin where he was the first chairman on their respective boards of directors. Gilbert left his position at Harvard to run Biogen as CEO, but was later asked to resign by the company's board of directors. He is a member of the Board of Scientific Governors at The Scripps Research Institute. Gilbert has served as the chairman of the Harvard Society of Fellows.

In 1996, Gilbert and Stuart B. Levy founded Paratek Pharmaceuticals. Gilbert served as chairman until 2014.

Gilbert was an early proponent of sequencing the human genome. At a March 1986 meeting in Santa Fe New Mexico he proclaimed "The total human sequence is the grail of human genetics". In 1987, he proposed starting a company called Genome Corporation to sequence the genome and sell access to the information. In an opinion piece in Nature in 1991, he envisioned completion of the human genome sequence transforming biology into a field in which computer databases would be as essential as laboratory reagents

Gilbert returned to Harvard in 1985. Gilbert was an outspoken critic of David Baltimore in the handling of the scientific fraud accusations against Thereza Imanishi-Kari. Gilbert also joined the early controversy over the cause of AIDS. In 1962, Gilbert's physics PhD student Gerald Guralnik extended Gilbert's work on massless particles; Guralnik's work is widely recognized as an important thread in the discovery of the Higgs Boson.

With his PhD student Benno Müller-Hill, Gilbert was the first to purify the lac repressor, just beating out Mark Ptashne for purifying the first gene regulatory protein.

Together with Allan Maxam, Gilbert developed a new DNA sequencing method, Maxam–Gilbert sequencing, using chemical methods developed by Andrei Mirzabekov. His approach to the first synthesis of insulin via recombinant DNA lost out to Genentech's approach which used genes built up from the nucleotides rather than from natural sources. Gilbert's effort was hampered by a temporary moratorium on recombinant DNA work in Cambridge, Massachusetts, forcing his group to move their work to an English biological weapons site.

Gilbert first proposed the terms introns (intragenic regions) and exons (expressed regions) in reference to recently discovered phenomenon of splicing and suggested explanation for the evolution of introns in a seminal 1978 "News and Views" correspondence to Nature titled "why genes in pieces?". In 1986, Gilbert proposed the RNA world hypothesis for the origin of life, based on a concept first proposed by Carl Woese in 1967.

== Awards and honors ==
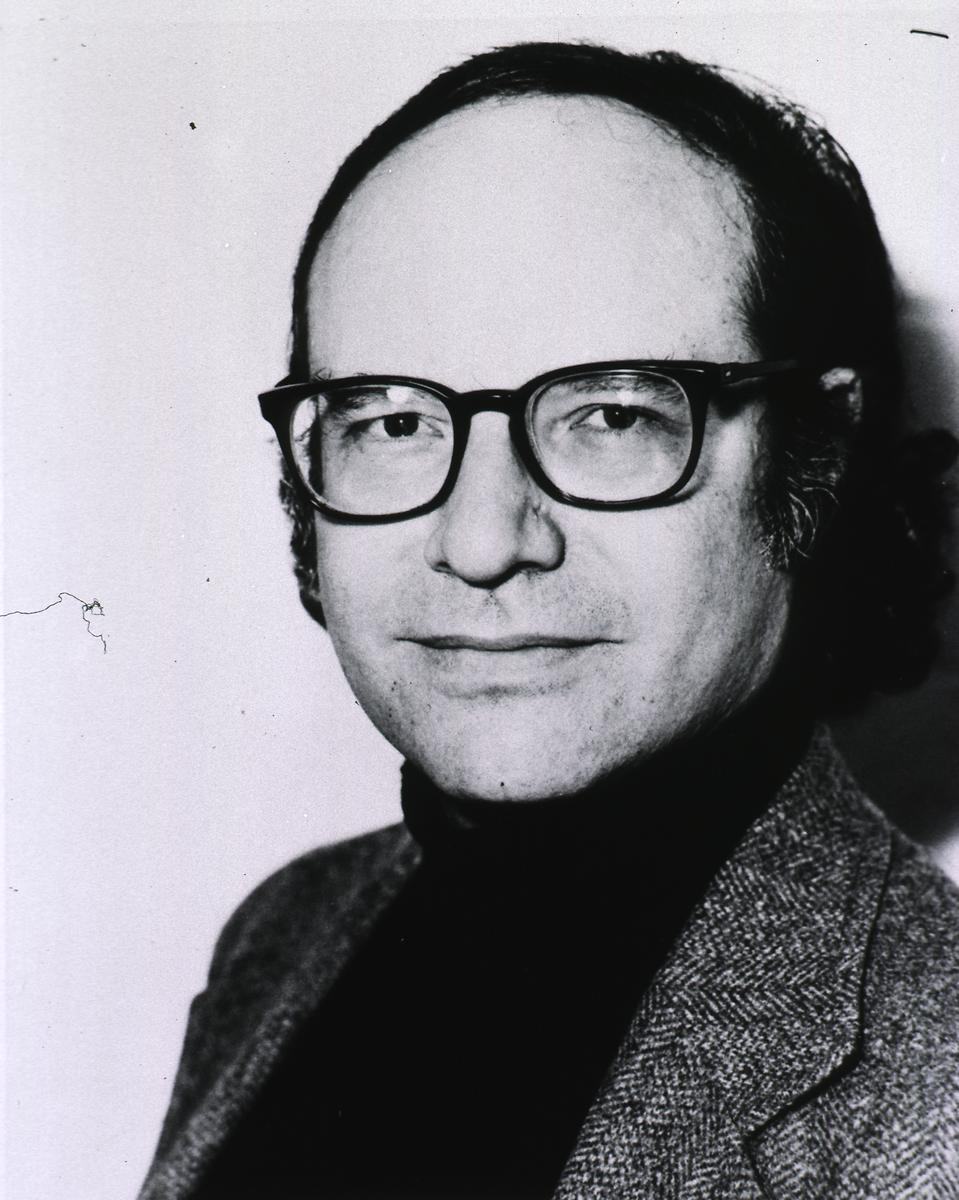
Walter Gilbert portrait via the National Library of Medicine

In 1969, Gilbert was awarded Harvard's Ledlie Prize. In 1972 he was named American Cancer Society Professor of Molecular Biology. In 1979, Gilbert was awarded the Louisa Gross Horwitz Prize from Columbia University together with Frederick Sanger. That year he was also awarded the Gairdner Prize and the Albert Lasker Award for Basic Medical Research.

Gilbert was awarded the 1980 Nobel Prize in Chemistry, shared with Frederick Sanger and Paul Berg. Gilbert and Sanger were recognized for their pioneering work in devising methods for determining the sequence of nucleotides in a nucleic acid.

Gilbert has also been honored by the National Academy of Sciences (US Steel Foundation Award, 1968); Massachusetts General Hospital (Warren Triennial Prize, 1977); the New York Academy of Sciences; (Louis and Bert Freedman Foundation Award, 1977), the Académie des Sciences of France (Prix Charles-Leopold Mayer Award, 1977). Gilbert was elected a Foreign Member of the Royal Society (ForMemRS) in 1987.

In 2002, he received the Biotechnology Heritage Award, from the Biotechnology Industry Organization (BIO) and the Chemical Heritage Foundation.

Allan Maxam and Walter Gilbert's 1977 paper "A new method for sequencing DNA" was honored by a Citation for Chemical Breakthrough Award from the Division of History of Chemistry of the American Chemical Society for 2017. It was presented to the Department of Molecular & Cellular Biology, Harvard University.

== Personal life ==
Gilbert married Celia Stone, the daughter of I. F. Stone, in 1953 and has two children. After retiring from Harvard in 2001, Gilbert has launched an artistic career to combine art and science. His art format is centered on digital photography.

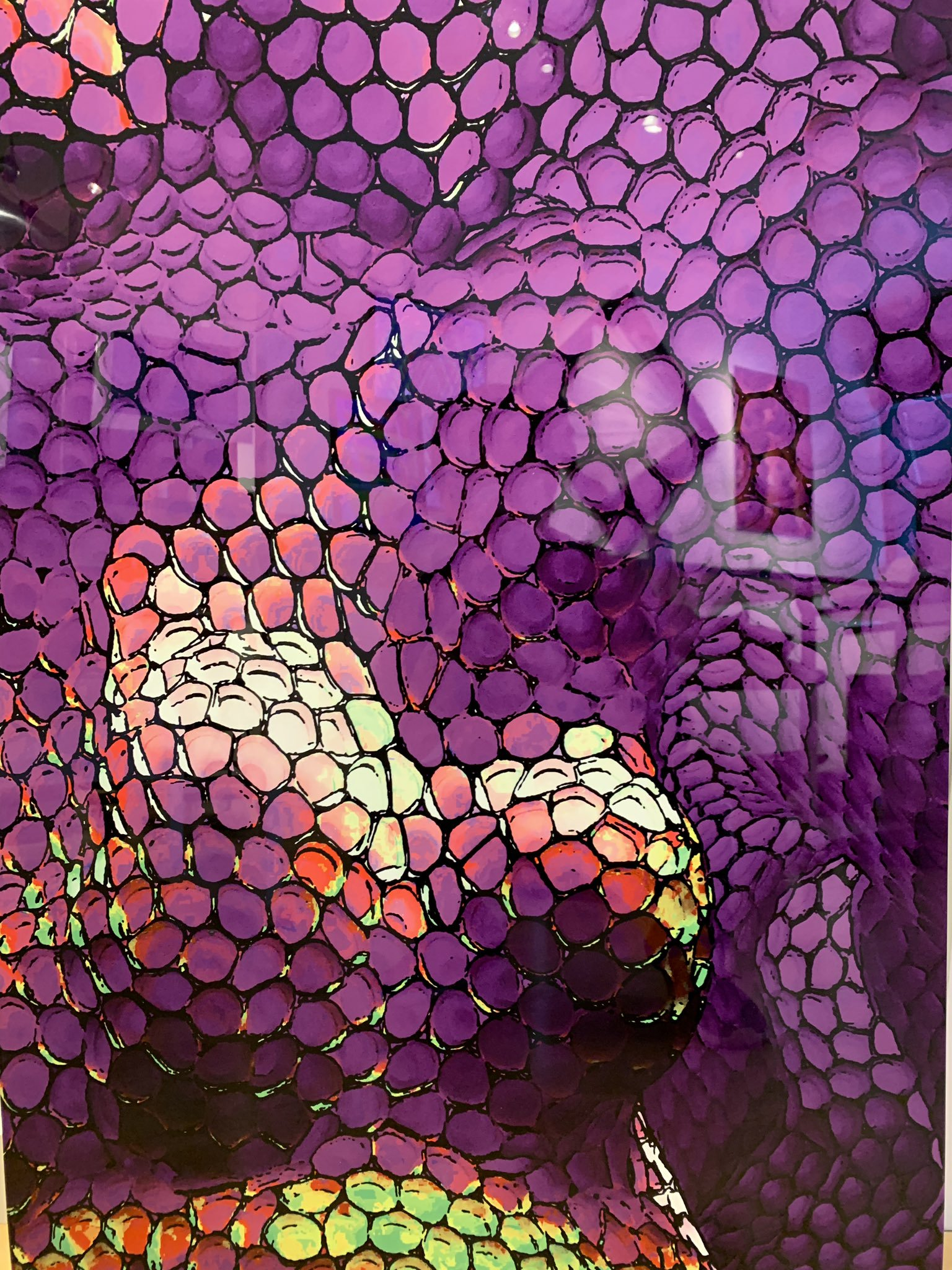
Purple Swirl by Wally Gilbert

== See also ==
- List of Jewish Nobel laureates
