= Phylogeography =

Subfield of genealogy

Phylogeography is the study of the historical processes that may be responsible for the past to present geographic distributions of genealogical lineages. This is accomplished by considering the geographic distribution of individuals in light of genetics, particularly population genetics.

This term was introduced to describe geographically structured genetic signals within and among species. An explicit focus on a species' biogeography/biogeographical past sets phylogeography apart from classical population genetics and phylogenetics.

Past events that can be inferred include population expansion, population bottlenecks, vicariance, dispersal, and migration. Recently developed approaches integrating coalescent theory or the genealogical history of alleles and distributional information can more accurately address the relative roles of these different historical forces in shaping current patterns.

== Historical development ==
The term phylogeography was first used by John Avise in his 1987 work Intraspecific Phylogeography: The Mitochondrial DNA Bridge Between Population Genetics and Systematics. Historical biogeography is a synthetic discipline that addresses how historical, geological, climatic and ecological conditions influenced the past and current distribution of species. As part of historical biogeography, researchers had been evaluating the geographical and evolutionary relationships of organisms years before. Two developments during the 1960s and 1970s were particularly important in laying the groundwork for modern phylogeography; the first was the spread of cladistic thought, and the second was the development of plate tectonics theory.

The resulting school of thought was vicariance biogeography, which explained the origin of new lineages through geological events like the drifting apart of continents or the formation of rivers. When a continuous population (or species) is divided by a new river or a new mountain range (i.e., a vicariance event), two populations (or species) are created. Paleogeography, geology and paleoecology are all important fields that supply information that is integrated into phylogeographic analyses.

Phylogeography takes a population genetics and phylogenetic perspective on biogeography. In the mid-1970s, population genetic analyses turned to mitochondrial markers. The advent of the polymerase chain reaction (PCR), the process where millions of copies of a DNA segment can be replicated, was crucial in the development of phylogeography.

Thanks to this breakthrough, the information contained in mitochondrial DNA sequences was much more accessible. Advances in both laboratory methods (e.g. capillary DNA sequencing technology) that allowed easier sequencing of DNA and computational methods that make better use of the data (e.g. employing coalescent theory) have helped improve phylogeographic inference. By 2000, Avise generated a seminal review of the topic in book form, in which he defined phylogeography as the study of the "principles and processes governing the geographic distributions of genealogical lineages... within and among closely related species."

Early phylogeographic work has recently been criticized for its narrative nature and lack of statistical rigor (i.e. it did not statistically test alternative hypotheses). The only real method was Alan Templeton's Nested Clade Analysis, which made use of an inference key to determine the validity of a given process in explaining the concordance between geographic distance and genetic relatedness. Recent approaches have taken a stronger statistical approach to phylogeography than was done initially.

Example

Climate change, such as the glaciation cycles of the past 2.4 million years, has periodically restricted some species into disjunct refugia. These restricted ranges may result in population bottlenecks that reduce genetic variation. Once a reversal in climate change allows for rapid migration out of refugial areas, these species spread rapidly into newly available habitat. A number of empirical studies find genetic signatures of both animal and plant species that support this scenario of refugia and postglacial expansion. This has occurred both in the tropics (where the main effect of glaciation is increasing aridity, i.e. the expansion of savanna and retraction of tropical rainforest) as well as temperate regions that were directly influenced by glaciers.

Human-made waterways can create complex, bidirectional invasion corridors that lead to a "reticulate kinship" structure rather than simple linear dispersal. For example, the Volga-Don Canal has facilitated a two-way exchange between the Azov-Black Sea and Caspian Sea basins. This has resulted in the mixing and introgressive hybridization of distinct phylogenetic lineages of Ponto-Caspian fish (such as certain goby species) in the Lower Volga, creating a complex genetic mosaic that challenges traditional tree-like models of population history.

== In conservation ==
Phylogeography can help in the prioritization of areas of high value for conservation. Phylogeographic analyses have also played an important role in defining evolutionary significant units (ESU), a unit of conservation below the species level that is often defined on unique geographic distribution and mitochondrial genetic patterns.

A recent study on imperiled cave crayfish in the Appalachian Mountains of eastern North America demonstrates how phylogenetic analyses along with geographic distribution can aid in recognizing conservation priorities. Using phylogeographical approaches, the authors found that hidden within what was thought to be a single, widely distributed species, an ancient and previously undetected species was also present. Conservation decisions can now be made to ensure that both lineages received protection. Results like this are not an uncommon outcome from phylogeographic studies.

An analysis of salamanders of the genus Eurycea, also in the Appalachians, found that the current taxonomy of the group greatly underestimated species level diversity. The authors of this study also found that patterns of phylogeographic diversity were more associated with historical (rather than modern) drainage connections, indicating that major shifts in the drainage patterns of the region played an important role in the generation of diversity of these salamanders. A thorough understanding of phylogeographic structure will thus allow informed choices in prioritizing areas for conservation.

== Comparing phylogenetic relationships ==
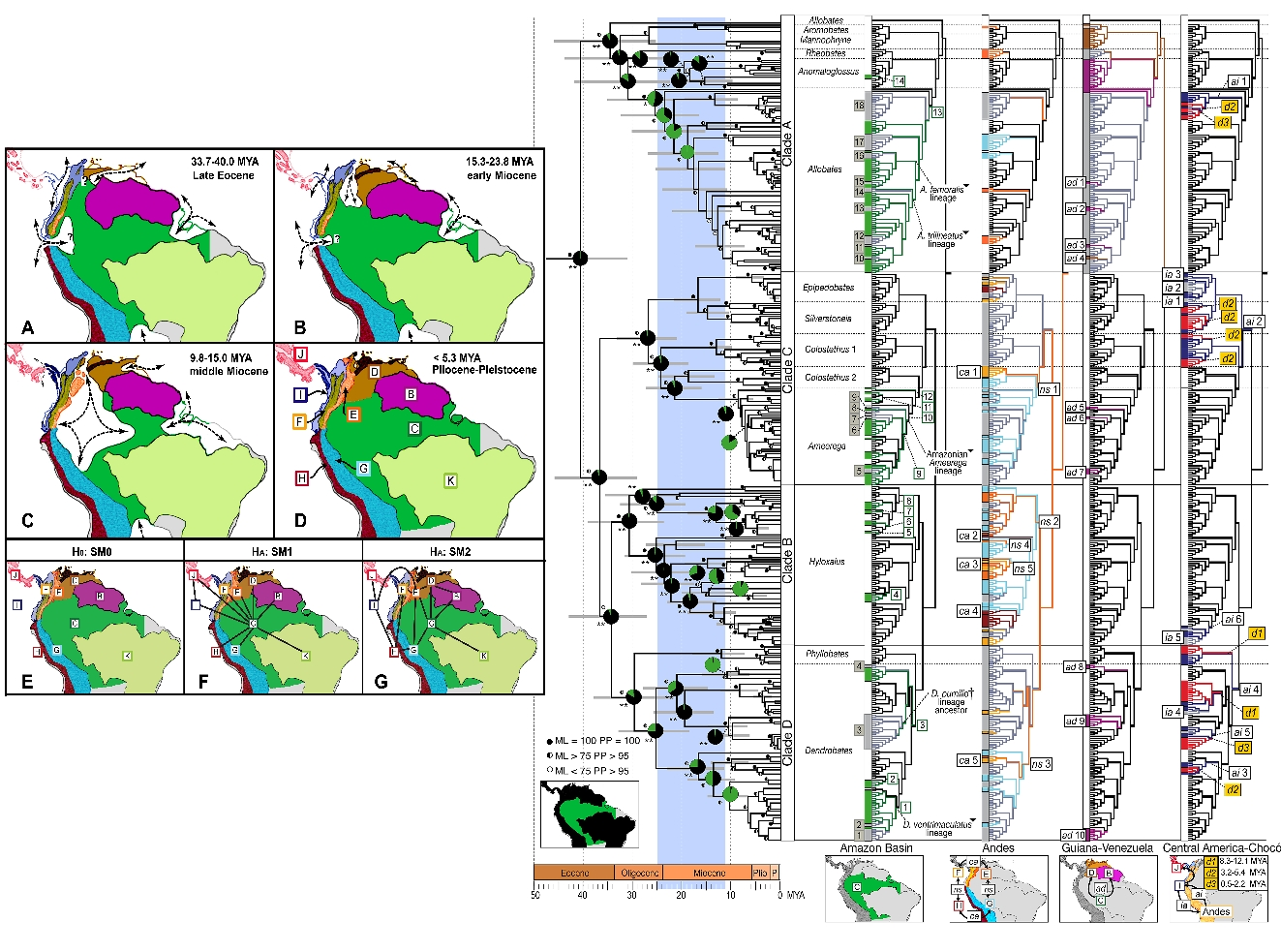
These figures map out the phylogeographic history of poison frogs in South America.

The field of comparative phylogeography seeks to explain the mechanisms responsible for the phylogenetic relationships and distribution of different species. For example, comparisons across multiple taxa can clarify the histories of biogeographical regions. For example, phylogeographic analyses of terrestrial vertebrates on the Baja California peninsula and marine fish on both the Pacific and gulf sides of the peninsula display genetic signatures that suggest a vicariance event affected multiple taxa during the Pleistocene or Pliocene.

Phylogeography also gives an important historical perspective on community composition. History is relevant to regional and local diversity in two ways. One, the size and makeup of the regional species pool results from the balance of speciation and extinction. Two, at a local level community composition is influenced by the interaction between local extinction of species' populations and recolonization. A comparative phylogenetic approach in the Australian Wet Tropics indicates that regional patterns of species distribution and diversity are largely determined by local extinctions and subsequent recolonizations corresponding to climatic cycles.

Phylogeography integrates biogeography and genetics to study in greater detail the lineal history of a species in context of the geoclimatic history of the planet. An example study of poison frogs living in the South American neotropics (illustrated to the left) is used to demonstrate how phylogeographers combine genetics and paleogeography to piece together the ecological history of organisms in their environments. Several major geoclimatic events have greatly influenced the biogeographic distribution of organisms in this area, including the isolation and reconnection of South America, the uplift of the Andes, an extensive Amazonian floodbasin system during the Miocene, the formation of Orinoco and Amazon drainages, and dry−wet climate cycles throughout the Pliocene to Pleistocene epochs.

Using this contextual paleogeographic information (paleogeographic time series is shown in panels A-D) the authors of this study proposed a null-hypothesis that assumes no spatial structure and two alternative hypothesis involving dispersal and other biogeographic constraints (hypothesis are shown in panels E-G, listed as SMO, SM1, and SM2). The phylogeographers visited the ranges of each frog species to obtain tissue samples for genetic analysis; researchers can also obtain tissue samples from museum collections.

The evolutionary history and relations among different poison frog species is reconstructed using phylogenetic trees derived from molecular data. The molecular trees are mapped in relation to paleogeographic history of the region for a complete phylogeographic study. The tree shown in the center of the figure has its branch lengths calibrated to a molecular clock, with the geological time bar shown at the bottom. The same phylogenetic tree is duplicated four more times to show where each lineage is distributed and is found (illustrated in the inset maps below, including Amazon basin, Andes, Guiana-Venezuela, Central America-Chocó).

The combination of techniques used in this study exemplifies more generally how phylogeographic studies proceed and test for patterns of common influence. Paleogeographic data establishes geological time records for historical events that explain the branching patterns in the molecular trees. This study rejected the null model and found that the origin for all extant Amazonian poison frog species primarily stem from fourteen lineages that dispersed into their respective areas after the Miocene floodbasin receded. Regionally based phylogeographic studies of this type are repeated for different species as a means of independent testing. Phylogeographers find broadly concordant and repeated patterns among species in most regions of the planet that is due to a common influence of paleoclimatic history.

== In humans ==
Phylogeography has also proven to be useful in understanding the origin and dispersal patterns of our own species, Homo sapiens. Based primarily on observations of skeletal remains of ancient human remains and estimations of their age, anthropologists proposed two competing hypotheses about human origins.

The first hypothesis is referred to as the Out-of-Africa with replacement model, which contends that the last expansion out of Africa around 100,000 years ago resulted in the modern humans displacing all previous Homo spp. populations in Eurasia that were the result of an earlier wave of emigration out of Africa. The multiregional scenario claims that individuals from the recent expansion out of Africa intermingled genetically with those human populations of more ancient African emigrations. A phylogeographic study that uncovered a Mitochondrial Eve that lived in Africa 150,000 years ago provided early support for the Out-of-Africa model.

While this study had its shortcomings, it received significant attention both within scientific circles and a wider audience. A more thorough phylogeographic analysis that used ten different genes instead of a single mitochondrial marker indicates that at least two major expansions out of Africa after the initial range extension of Homo erectus played an important role shaping the modern human gene pool and that recurrent genetic exchange is pervasive. These findings strongly demonstrated Africa's central role in the evolution of modern humans, but also indicated that the multiregional model had some validity. These studies have largely been supplanted by population genomic studies that use orders of magnitude more data.

In light of these recent data from the 1000 genomes project, genomic-scale SNP databases sampling thousands of individuals globally and samples taken from two non-Homo sapiens hominins (Neanderthals and Denisovans), the picture of human evolutionary has become more resolved and complex involving possible Neanderthal and Denisovan admixture, admixture with archaic African hominins, and Eurasian expansion into the Australasian region that predates the standard out of African expansion.

== In viruses ==
Viruses are informative in understanding the dynamics of evolutionary change due to their rapid mutation rate and fast generation time. Phylogeography is a useful tool in understanding the origins and distributions of different viral strains. A phylogeographic approach has been taken for many diseases that threaten human health, including dengue fever, rabies, influenza and HIV. Similarly, a phylogeographic approach will likely play a key role in understanding the vectors and spread of avian influenza (HPAI H5N1), demonstrating the relevance of phylogeography to the general public.

== Of languages ==
Phylogeographic analysis of ancient and modern languages has been used to test whether Indo-European languages originated in Anatolia or in the steppes of Central Asia. Language evolution was modeled in terms of the gain and loss of cognate words in each language over time, to produce a cladogram of related languages. Combining those data with known geographic ranges of each language produced strong support for an Anatolian origin approximately 8000–9500 years ago.

== See also ==
- Lacey Knowles
- Landscape genetics and genomics
- Peripatric speciation
- Population genetics and genomics
