= Landscape genomics =

Study of environmental factors and genetic adaptation

Landscape genomics is one of many strategies used to identify relationships between environmental factors and the genetic adaptation of organisms in response to these factors such as climate and soil. Landscape genomics combines aspects of landscape ecology, population genetics and landscape genetics. The latter addresses how landscape features influence the population structure and gene flow of organisms across time and space. The field of landscape genomics is distinct from landscape genetics in that it is not focused on the neutral genetic processes, but considers, in addition to neutral processes such as drift and gene flow, explicitly adaptive processes, i.e. the role of natural selection.

Population genomics utilizes outlier tests to identify genetic variation, which rely on identifying high genetic variation in populations. However, more subtle forms of genetic variation can be detected in landscape genomics. Additionally, outlier tests do not aim to, nor do they facilitate the identification of selection pressures from the local environment that caused genetic variation. Contrarily, landscape genomics aims to identify changes in the genome directly resulting from local environmental factors.

== History ==
Landscape genomics is a relatively new field, made possible by recent technological advances in genetic mapping. Genomics is the study of the genome, otherwise known as the collection of all of the genes in one organism. Landscape genetics uses technology capable of monitoring 5-20 genetic markers at a time, whereas technology has advanced so that it is now capable of mapping an entire genome, including additional types of genetic markers. Landscape genomics analyzes adaptive markers, whereas landscape genetics only analyzes neutral markers. The field of genomics began to grow in the 1970s when new technology was discovered by A.M. Maxam and W. Gilbert, and continued to advance with the widely recognized Human Genome Project. It was the application of the technology and strategies used in genomics to landscape genetics that created the field of landscape genomics.

== Methods ==
Landscape genomics makes use of several fields of study. Environmental association analysis is used to link adaptive processes and genetic markers to local environmental factors. This is often done by selecting one environmental factor, e.g. water salinity or altitude. Continuous data from this factor is then aligned with genetic polymorphisms data from an organism inhabiting the same time and place, and data analysis can then be conducted to detect potential correlations.

Gene sequencing is also necessary in order to identify the genetic markers that are to be studied in correlation with environmental factors.

== Applications in research ==
Landscape genomics has provided an opportunity to examine potential implications of climate change based on how organisms respond to changing temperatures and climate. In one example, researchers studied several populations of the black alder tree, and through landscape genomics found that it is highly adaptive to temperature and latitude changes. This has meaningful implications, as it can help researchers predict how the black alder will react to climate change in the future. Together with complementary research on the ecological role of the black alder, it is also possible to predict how the environment surrounding black alder populations will change.
