= GeneCalling =

In the field of genomics, GeneCalling is an open-platform mRNA transcriptional profiling technique. The GeneCalling protocol measures levels of cDNA, which are correlated with gene expression levels of specific transcripts. Differences between gene expression in healthy tissues and disease or drug responsive tissues are examined and compared in this technology. The technique has been applied to the study of human tissues and plant tissues.

== Method ==
GeneCalling Process

In the GeneCalling protocol, mRNAs are first isolated from a given sample and processed into fragments for analysis. This usually involves the synthesis and subdivision of double-stranded cDNAs from polyA RNA. Distinct sets of restriction enzymes can then be used to digest sets of the divided cDNAs and resulting fragments ligated to labelled adapters to be amplified by PCR. PCR products are then purified and subjected to gel electrophoresis on a mounted platform employing stationary laser excitation and a multi-colour charge-coupled device imaging system. A fluorescent label at the 5' end of one of the PCR primers allows for visualization of the PCR fragments, and the cDNAs are subjected to several isolated and identical restriction digests to generate a merged profile based on peak height and variance. The merged digestion profiles from the cDNA preparations are then compared to locate differentially expressed fragments (such as between normal tissue and diseased or drug responsive tissue); these profiles are compared by means of various internet-ready databases such as GeneScape.
