= Lacey Knowles =

American ecologist and evolutionary biologist

L. Lacey Knowles
- Scientific career
- Fields: Ecology, evolutionary biology
- Institutions: University of Michigan
- Website: lsa.umich.edu/eeb/people/faculty/knowlesl.html

L. Lacey Knowles is an ecologist and evolutionary biologist known for her work with speciation, sexual selection, phylogeography, and evolutionary radiation.

== Career ==
Knowles is an ecologist and evolutionary biologist known for her work with speciation, sexual selection, phylogeography, and evolutionary radiation.

Knowles received her Ph.D. in Ecology and Evolution from the State University of New York at Stony Brook and had a Postdoctoral Fellowship in the Department of Ecology and Evolutionary Biology at the University of Arizona.As of 2012, she is a professor at the University of Michigan and the curator of insects at the university's museum of zoology. She has been an elected member of the councils for the Society for the Study of Evolution and the Society of Systematic Biology. Knowles has also served as an associate editor of scientific journals such as Evolution, Molecular Ecology, Systematic Biology, and Heredity. She is the author of Estimating Species Trees: Practical and Theoretical Aspects.

== Awards ==
- In 2023, Knowles was elected a Fellow of the American Association for the Advancement of Science.
