= Landscape genetics =

Combination of population genetics and landscape ecology

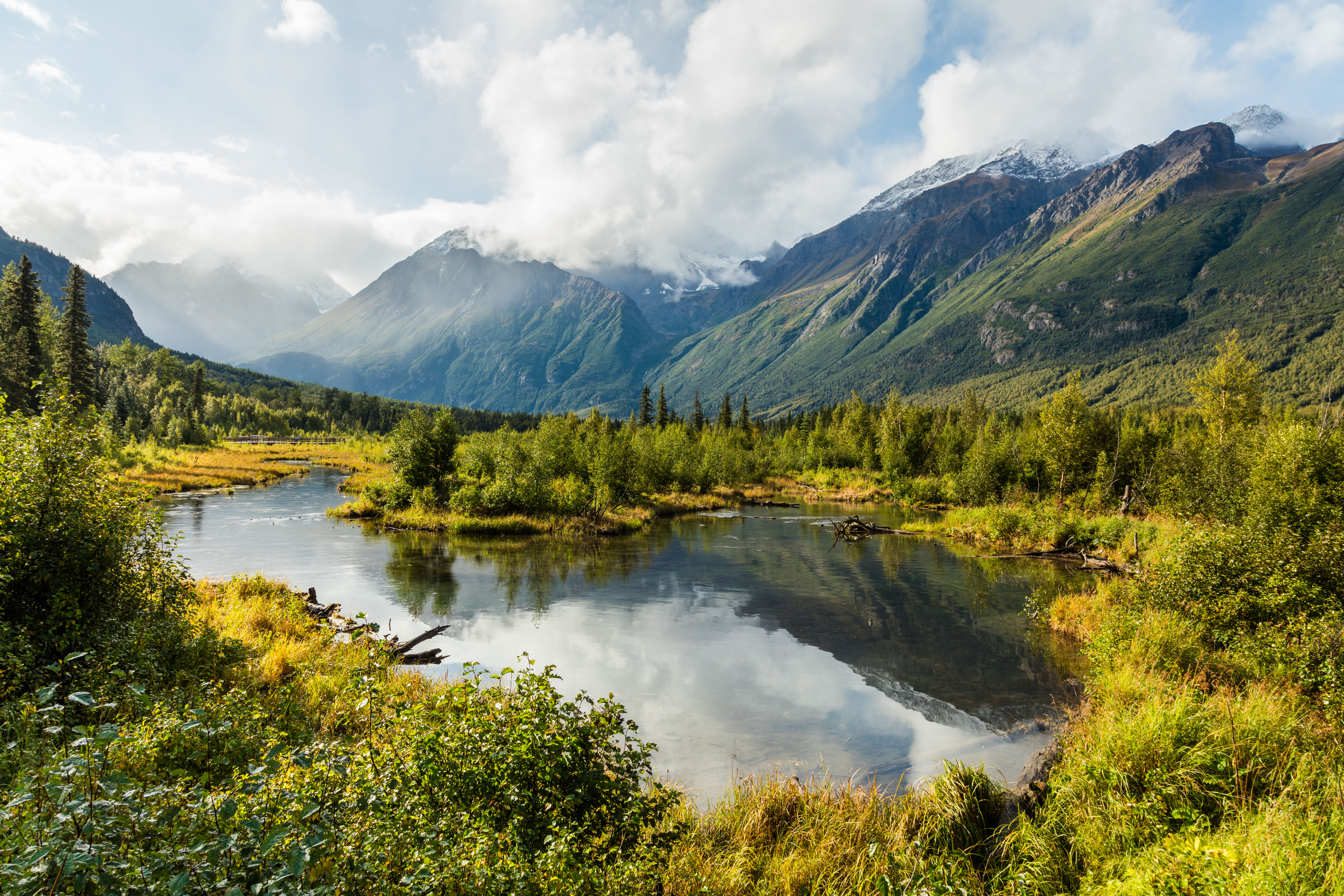
Rivers and mountains can act as barriers to dispersal, thus preventing gene flow between populations.

Landscape genetics is the scientific discipline that combines population genetics and landscape ecology. It broadly encompasses any study that analyses plant or animal population genetic data in conjunction with data on the landscape features and matrix quality where the sampled population lives. This allows for the analysis of microevolutionary processes affecting the species in light of landscape spatial patterns, providing a more realistic view of how populations interact with their environments. Landscape genetics attempts to determine which landscape features are barriers to dispersal and gene flow, how human-induced landscape changes affect the evolution of populations, the source-sink dynamics of a given population, and how diseases or invasive species spread across landscapes.

Landscape genetics differs from the fields of biogeography and phylogeography by providing information at finer temporal and spatial scales (i.e., at the level of individual genetic variation within a population). Because it focuses on sampling individuals, landscape genetics has the advantage of not having to subjectively define discrete populations prior to analysis. Genetic tools are used to detect abrupt genetic differences between individuals within a population and statistical tools are used to correlate these genetic discontinuities with landscape and environmental features. The results of landscape genetics studies have potentially important applications to conservation biology and land management practices.

== History ==
Landscape genetics emerged as its own discipline after the seminal article entitled "Landscape genetics: combining landscape ecology and population genetics" by Manel et al. appeared in the journal Trends in Ecology and Evolution in 2003. According to that article, the concept that landscape patterns affect how organisms are distributed dates back to the 18th and 19th centuries in the writings of Augustin Pyramus de Candolle and Alfred Russel Wallace. The modern field is interdisciplinary and integrates not only population genetics and landscape ecology, but also the field of spatial statistics. As of 2008, over 655 articles had been published in the field in a variety of genetics and ecological journals.

Map of the McArthur Lake Wildlife Corridor in northern Idaho, United States. It links to adjacent wilderness areas.

== Advances and applications ==
Landscape genetics has advanced ecological and evolutionary theory by facilitating an understanding of how gene flow and adaptation occur in real heterogeneous landscapes. It has also allowed for the estimation of functional connectivity across landscapes. Elucidating landscape features that act as barriers or facilitators of dispersal can inform the construction or preservation of wildlife corridors that connect fragmented landscapes. Landscape genetics can also help predict how diseases will spread across a landscape or how proposed management actions will affect populations. Finally, landscape genetics can help predict how well populations will adapt to continuing global change.

== Methods ==
=== Genetic markers ===
Molecular markers of genetic diversity such as DNA microsatellites, mitochondrial DNA, amplified fragment length polymorphisms, and alloenzymes are tested in random individuals of a particular species across a landscape. These markers are used to determine the genotype (genetic make-up) of the individuals tested.

=== Landscape and environmental features ===
Landscape features include landscape composition (abundance and variety of patch types), landscape configuration (how these patches are arranged in space), and the quality of the matrix (the space in a landscape between patches of habitat for a given species). Topography, altitude, habitat types, and potential barriers such as rivers or road are examples of landscape variables.

=== Statistical tools ===
==== Identifying genetic patterns ====
Various statistical tools are utilized to identify genetic patterns from the genetic markers collected. Methods that cluster individuals into subpopulations based on genetic differentiation or distance, such as fixation index (F_{ST}) and Bayesian assignment methods, are often used. However, because individuals are sometimes evenly distributed rather than spatially clustered across a landscape, these methods are limited and alternative methods are being developed.

==== Correlating genetic patterns to landscape ====
Statistical tools such as the Mantel test or partial Mantel test are commonly used to correlate genetic patterns with landscape features. Linear regression models and ordination techniques are also common. Geographic information systems (GIS) can be used to visualize genetic patterns across space by plotting genetic data on a map of the landscape.

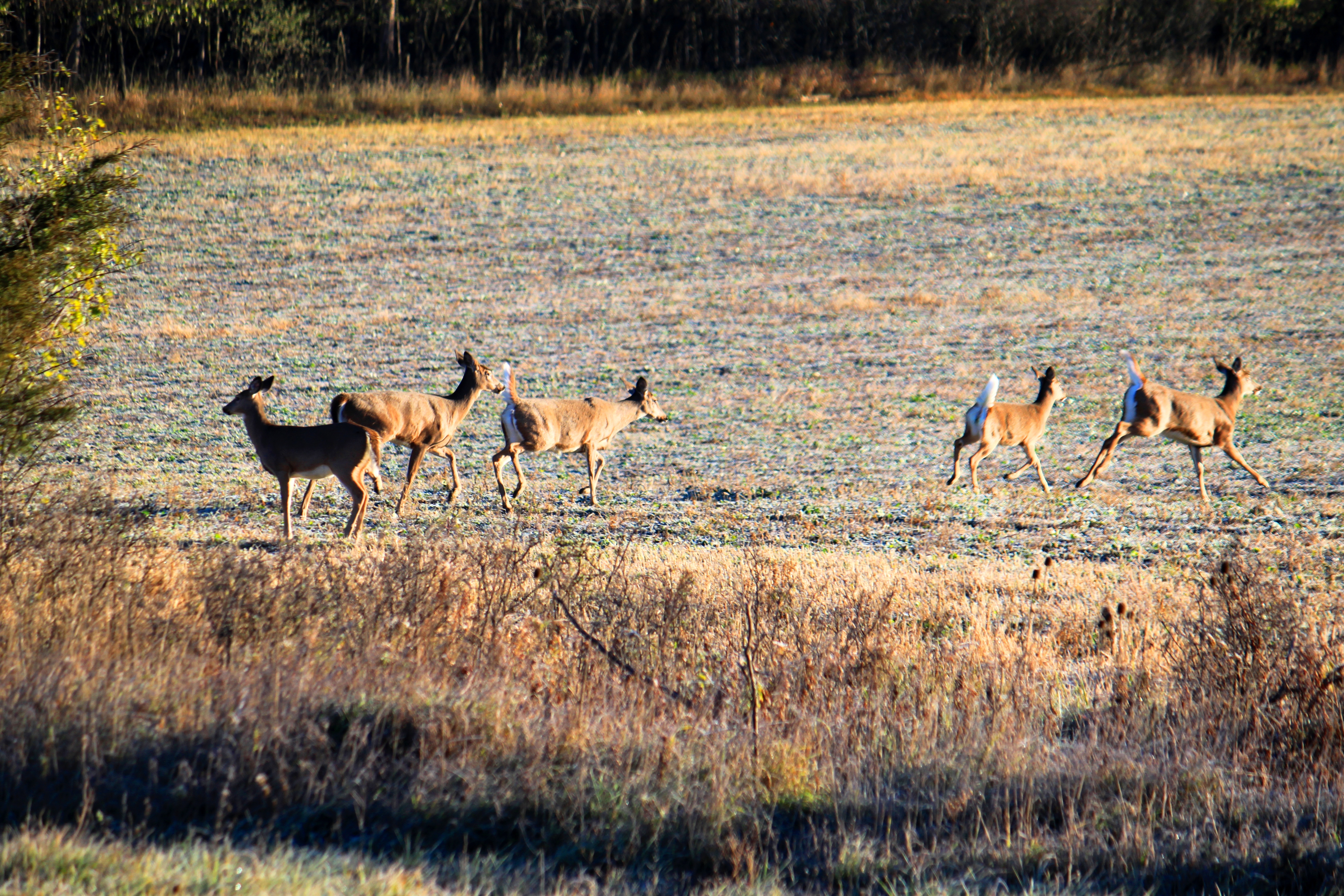
White tail deer

== Example ==
A study published in 2012 analyzed the landscape genetics of white tail deer in Wisconsin and Illinois. They extracted DNA from the lymph nodes of 2,069 harvested deer across 64 townships. Fifteen microsatellite markers were used for genotyping. A Bayesian population assignment test found no distinct subpopulations based on the genetic data. Correlograms were used to elucidate fine-scale social structure, and found that more heavily forested and fragmented townships had more genetic relatedness between individual deer. Spatial principal component analysis was used to elucidate broad-scale population connectivity. Partial Mantel tests found a correlation between genetic distance and geographic barriers, particularly roads and rivers. However, these were not absolute barriers and did not divide the deer into distinct subpopulations.

The finding of high genetic connectivity among the sampled deer has management implications for the setting of harvest number and population goals. The finding of high genetic connectivity also has implications for the spread of chronic wasting disease among deer.

== Sub-disciplines ==
=== Seascape genetics ===
Seascape genetics is a sub discipline of landscape genomics that scientists started to use in 2006. The emergence of this field proceeded landscape genetics, advances in genetic laboratory technology, and higher resolution marine environmental data. Like landscape genetics, seascape genetics is a multidisciplinary field. Areas of expertise used in seascape genetics includes oceanography, ecology, and population genetics. Seascapes differ from landscapes due to differential connectivity in the aquatic environment. Currents allow for increased connectivity in some locations and restrict connectivity elsewhere. Many organisms that live in the ocean rely on currents to move their gametes and larvae which is called dispersal. Variable dispersal availability leads to subpopulations that have different structure; therefore, subpopulations are exposed to distinct selective pressures, experience separate rates of drift and have unique genetic diversity.

Seascape genomics is a tool that utilizes genetic markers in tandem with current patterns to better understand dispersal. Another key difference when studying marine systems is that many animals have extremely large population sizes. Substantial population sizes in the marine setting allows for greater adaptive potential with larger effective population size, meaning the portion of the population that is reproducing and passing along genes increases. A large population will have greater influence from selection than drift, thus marine organisms are more likely to have greater levels of local adaptation. In seascape analyses, genetic data allows for greater species understanding and tracking when the full life history is unknown or unable to be studied with ecology. Population genetics incorporates many theories and techniques, all of which need to be taken into consideration for seascape and landscape analyses. There are several ways to collect genetic information. Popular methods in seascape genetics have been single nucleotide polymorphisms (SNPs), mitochondrial DNA, random amplified polymorphic DNAs, microsatellites, allozymes, and full genomes. Collecting and processing sufficient samples has been a time-consuming process in the past. Next generation sequencing has helped to expand the field of landscape genomics because it allows for rapid sequencing of extremely large genomes.

Seascape genomics can be applied marine life with varying life histories to answer various questions about genetic influences on population dynamics. Analyzes on sessile organisms, animals such as clams that stay in the same place their whole life, can easily be analyzed to better understand environmental evolutionary pressures. One example, Salmoni et at used environmental data and genetic analysis to identify a heat tolerant gene in corals. Many other studies have been done on organisms such as oysters, seagrass, and mussels. Motile animals, animals that can move around, have also been studies through seascape genomics. DiBattista and his team studied how hydrodynamics influences snapper larval disbursement and were able to characterize connectivity between populations. Studies that utilize seascape genomics can be used in conservation and restoration efforts. This type of studies can help to define resilient individuals or classify areas that would be best for marine protected area due to their ecological purpose.

=== Landscape genomics ===
Landscape genomics also correlates genetic data with landscape data, but the genetic data comes from multiple loci (locations on a chromosome) across the genome of the organism, as in population genomics. Landscape genetics typically measures less than a dozen different microsatellites in an organism, while landscape genomics often measures single nucleotide polymorphisms at thousands of loci. This allows for the identification of outlier loci that may be under selection. Correlation to landscape data allows for identification of landscape factors contributing to genetic adaptation. This field is growing due to advances in next-generation sequencing techniques.

== Pitfalls ==
As a new and fast growing interdisciplinary field with no explicitly identified best practices, it has been subject to a number of flaws in both study design and interpretation. A 2016 publication identified four common pitfalls of landscape genetics research that should be targeted for correction. These include assuming gene flow is always advantageous, overgeneralizing results, failing to consider other processes that affect the genetic structure of populations, and mistaking quantitative methods for robust study design. In particular, authors have been encouraged to report their sampling design, reproducibility of molecular data, and details on the spatial data set and spatial analyses utilized. Because the effects of landscape on gene flow are not universal, sweeping generalities cannot be made, and species-specific studies are necessary.

Many of these pitfalls result from the interdisciplinary nature of landscape genetics, and could be avoided with better collaboration among specialists in the fields of population genetics, landscape ecology, spatial statistics, and geography.
