= Thomas Roderick =

American geneticist

Thomas Huston Roderick, Ph.D., (1930–2013) was an American geneticist who coined the term “genomics".

Roderick earned degrees from the University of Michigan in philosophy in 1952 and zoology in 1953 and went on receive a Ph.D. from the University of California, Berkeley. He then joined The Jackson Laboratory in Bar Harbor as a geneticist. He researched behavioral genetics, the effects of radiation on genetic material, and bioinformatics. In 1973–1975 he worked at the United States Atomic Energy Commission, examining the health impacts of nuclear radiation.
