= John Avise =

American biologist, conservationist, and natural historian (born 1948)

John Charles Avise
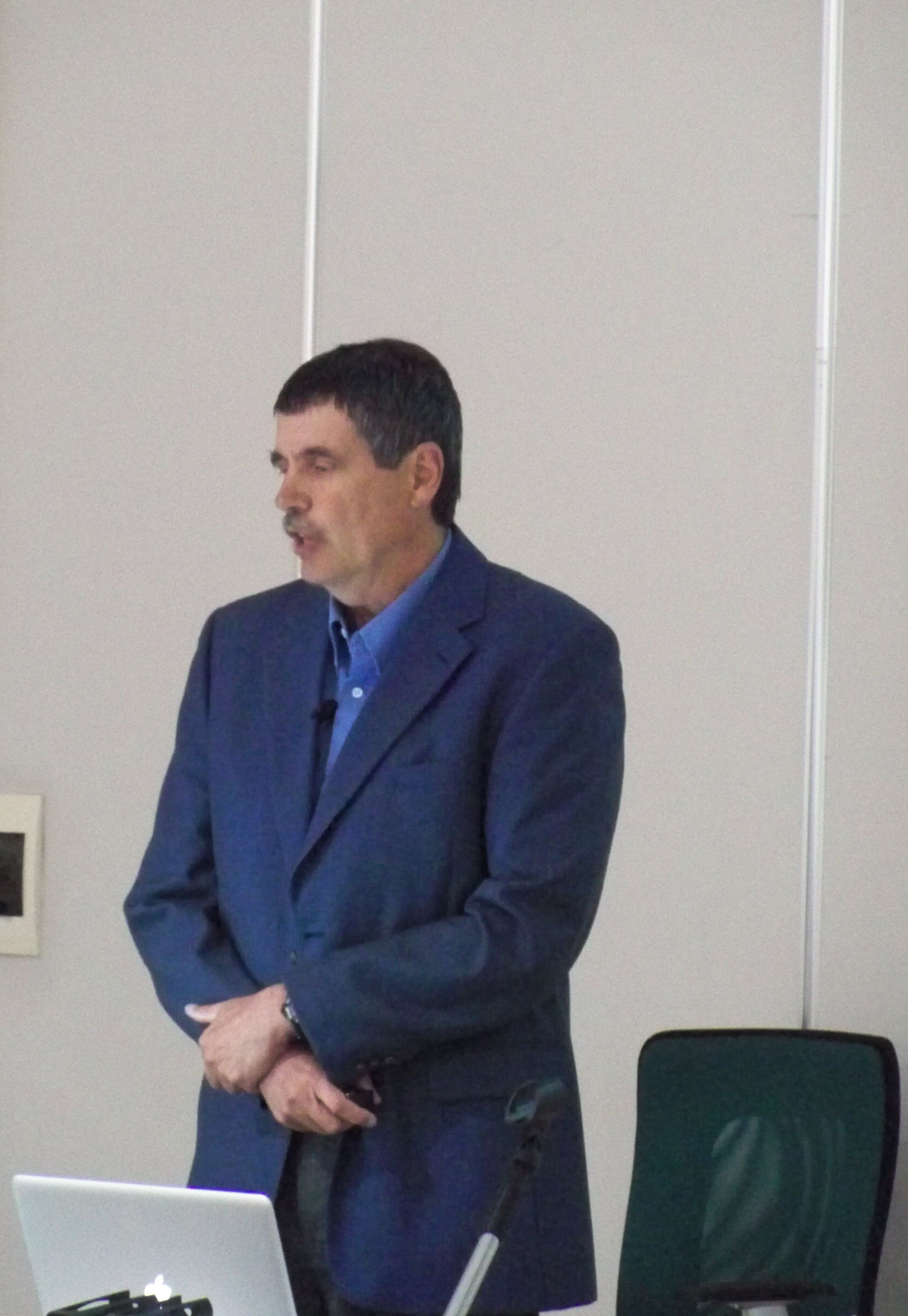
- Born: 1948 (age 77–78); Grand Rapids, Michigan, US
- Education: University of Michigan
- Known for: Phylogeography, Conservation Genetics, Evolutionary Genetics, Ecological Genetics
- Scientific career
- Fields: Genetics, Evolutionary Biology, Phylogeography
- Workplaces: University of California, Irvine

John Charles Avise (born 1948) is an American evolutionary geneticist, conservationist, natural historian, and prolific science author. He is an Emeritus Distinguished Professor of Ecology & Evolution, University of California, Irvine, and was previously a Distinguished Professor of Genetics at the University of Georgia.

Born in Grand Rapids, Michigan, Avise (pronounced "Avis") received his B.S. in 1970 in Natural Resources from the University of Michigan; his M.A.in 1971 in Zoology from the University of Texas at Austin; and his Ph.D. in 1975 in Genetics from the University of California, Davis. Avise's research entails the use of molecular markers to analyze ecological, behavioral, and evolutionary processes in nature.

== Research and scientific contributions ==
In 1972, Avise published an early allozyme analysis of a cave-fish species, and uncovered the profound effects of inbreeding and genetic drift in nature. During the 1970s and 1980s, his protein-electrophoretic work on many fishes, mammals, birds, and other creatures demonstrated that natural populations are genetically highly polymorphic and that molecular markers can be utilized to address many natural-history topics that previously had been analyzed solely from phenotypic data. He thereby helped to pioneer the fields of molecular ecology and molecular evolution. In 1994, he published Molecular Markers, Natural History and Evolution, a comprehensive textbook on the application of genetic markers in ecological, behavioral, and evolutionary contexts. In the late 1970s, he was among the first to introduce mitochondrial (mt) DNA to population biology. This seminal work laid the foundation for phylogeography, a field for which he is recognized as the founding father. Among the many phylogeographic applications for which his laboratory paved the way were genetic assessments of marine and freshwater turtles, catadromous eels, unisexual fishes, and regional assemblages of birds, fishes, mammals, herps, and marine invertebrates. Beginning in the 1990s, Avise capitalized upon highly polymorphic microsatellite loci to analyze animal mating systems in nature, on creatures ranging from sea spiders and snails to polyembryonic armadillos to numerous fishes, including male-pregnant pipefishes and seahorses, and hermaphroditic killifishes. This line of inquiry eventuated in many articles plus a trilogy of authored books dealing with evolutionary perspectives on clonality (2008), hermaphroditism (2011), and pregnancy (2013). In addition to research in molecular ecology and evolution, Avise has published on the relevance of evolutionary genetics to human affairs ranging from religious beliefs, to the human genome, to genetically modified organisms, to the history and philosophy of science, and even to the roles of humor and poetry in communicating science to the public. In 2006, Avise helped to inaugurate a series of annual Colloquia, sponsored by the National Academy of Sciences, broadly entitled "In the Light of Evolution" (ILE). Each ILE installment highlighted a different topic that can be informed by evolutionary thought and has broader societal relevance. Proceedings of ten ILE colloquia were published in special issues of PNAS, and eight of them also appeared as edited books from the National Academies Press.

Avise published more than 360 peer-reviewed papers, plus more than 30 books (18 of which he solo-authored). Most of these books were published by academic publishers, including Chapman & Hall (2 books), Harvard University Press (2 books), Smithsonian Institution Press (2 books), Oxford University Press (3 books), Cambridge University Press, Columbia University Press (2 books), Sinauer, Springer, Academic Press (2 books), and Johns Hopkins University Press (2 books), among others. Some of the books are textbooks intended for professionals and their students, while others provide outreach about natural history and evolution for broader audiences. According to Google Scholar, his works have been cited more than 80,000 times and he holds an h-index of 124. Avise served on the editorial boards for 15 scientific journals, and for several years was on the Board on Biology of the National Research Council. He has also traveled and lectured widely, having delivered lectures in all 50 U.S. states and 38 countries.

Avise has taught many university courses in genetics and evolution, including Introductory Biology, undergraduate courses in Genetics and Evolution, and graduate courses in Phylogeography and Molecular Ecology. During most of his 45 years in academia, he also taught a course in Ornithology, ultimately stemming from his lifelong appreciation of birds. This is ironic, because "avis" in Latin means "bird".

In 2020, Avise retired from the University of California Irvine. In 2021, Avise donated his writings (including 32 books and 365 journal articles) to the Library of the American Philosophical Society in Philadelphia, PA.

== Honors and distinctions ==
- 1970: Intramural Athlete of the Year, University of Michigan
- 1985: Fellow, American Association for the Advancement of Science
- 1986: Creative Research Medal, University of Georgia
- 1987: Vice-President, Society for the Study of Evolution
- 1988: Lamar Dodd Award, University of Georgia
- 1991: Member, National Academy of Sciences USA
- 1992: Sloan Foundation Fellow in Molecular Evolution
- 1994: Earle R. Greene Award, Georgia Ornithological Society
- 1994: President, Society for the Study of Evolution
- 1994: Fellow, American Ornithologists' Union
- 1994: Fellow, American Academy of Arts and Sciences
- 1997: William Brewster Memorial Award, American Ornithologists' Union
- 1997: Wilhelmine E. Key Award, American Genetic Association
- 1998: Pew Fellow in Marine Conservation
- 2000: President, American Genetic Association
- 2004: President, Society for Molecular Biology and Evolution
- 2006: Molecular Ecology Prize, Molecular Ecology Journal
- 2007: Alfred Russel Wallace Award, International Biogeography Society
- 2008: National Associate Award, National Research Council
- 2010: Distinguished Faculty Award for Research, University of California, Irvine
- 2011: Fellow, American Philosophical Society
- 2013: Outstanding Academic Titles Award from Choice, the American Library Association
- 2014: Genetics Hall of Excellence, American Fisheries Society
- 2018: Fellow, California Academy of Sciences

== Publications ==
- John Avise Publications (University Website)

Some of his 32 Books:

- Avise, John C. (2019). Avise's Letters Home: Travel Diaries from 1974-2004, Outskirts Press ISBN 978-1-977-20414-1
- Avise, John C. (2018). From Aardvarks to Zooxanthellae: The Definitive Lyrical Guide to Nature's Ways. Springer ISBN 978-3-319-71624-4
- Avise, John C. (2016). Sketches of Nature: A Geneticist's Look at the Biological World During a Golden Era for Molecular Ecology. Academic Press. ISBN 978-0-128-01945-0
- Avise, John C. and Ayala, Francisco J. (2014). Essential Readings in Evolutionary Biology. Johns Hopkins University Press. ISBN 978-1-421-41305-1
- Avise, John C. (2014). Conceptual Breakthroughs in Evolutionary Genetics: A Brief History of Shifting Paradigms. Academic Press. ISBN 978-0--12420-166-8
- Avise, John C. (2013). Evolutionary Perspectives on Pregnancy. Columbia University Press. ISBN 978-0-23116-060-5
- Avise, John C. (2011). Hermaphroditism: A Primer on the Biology, Ecology, and Evolution of Dual Sexuality. Columbia University Press. ISBN 978-0-23115-386-7.
- Avise, John C. (2010). Inside the Human Genome: A Case for Non-Intelligent Design. Oxford University Press. ISBN 0-19-539343-0.
- Avise, John C. (2010). Molecular Ecology and Evolution: The Organismal Side. World Scientific. ISBN 978-981-4317-75-7.
- Avise, John C. (2008). Clonality: The Genetics, Ecology, and Evolution of Sexual Abstinence in Vertebrate Animals. Oxford University Press. ISBN 978-0-195-36967-0.
- Avise, John C. (2007). On Evolution. Johns Hopkins University Press. ISBN 978-0-801-88689-8.
- Avise, John C. (2007). A Field Guide To Little Known Genetically Engineered Organisms. BainBridgeBooks. ISBN 978-954-642-292-7.
- Avise, John C. (2006). Evolutionary Pathways in Nature: A Phylogenetic Approach. Cambridge University Press. ISBN 978-0-521-67417-1.
- Avise, John C. (2004). Molecular Markers, Natural History and Evolution (2nd Revised ed.). Sinauer Associates. ISBN 978-0-87893-041-8.
- Avise, John C. (2004). The Hope, Hype, and Reality of Genetic Engineering. Oxford University Press. ISBN 0-19-516950-6.
- Avise, John C. (2002). Genetics in the Wild. Smithsonian Books. ISBN 978-1-58834-069-6.
- Avise, John C. (2001). Captivating Life: A Naturalist in the Age of Genetics. Smithsonian Books. ISBN 978-1-56098-957-8.
- Avise, John C. (2000). Phylogeography: The History and Formation of Species. Harvard University Press. ISBN 978-0-674-66638-2.
- Avise, John C. (1998). The Genetic Gods: Evolution and Belief in Human Affairs. Harvard University Press. ISBN 978-0-674-00533-4.
- Avise, John C; Hamrick, James L (1996). Conservation Genetics: Case Histories from Nature. Chapman & Hall. ISBN 978-0-412-05581-2.
- Avise, John C. (1994). Molecular Markers, Natural History and Evolution. Chapman & Hall. ISBN 0-412-03771-8.
