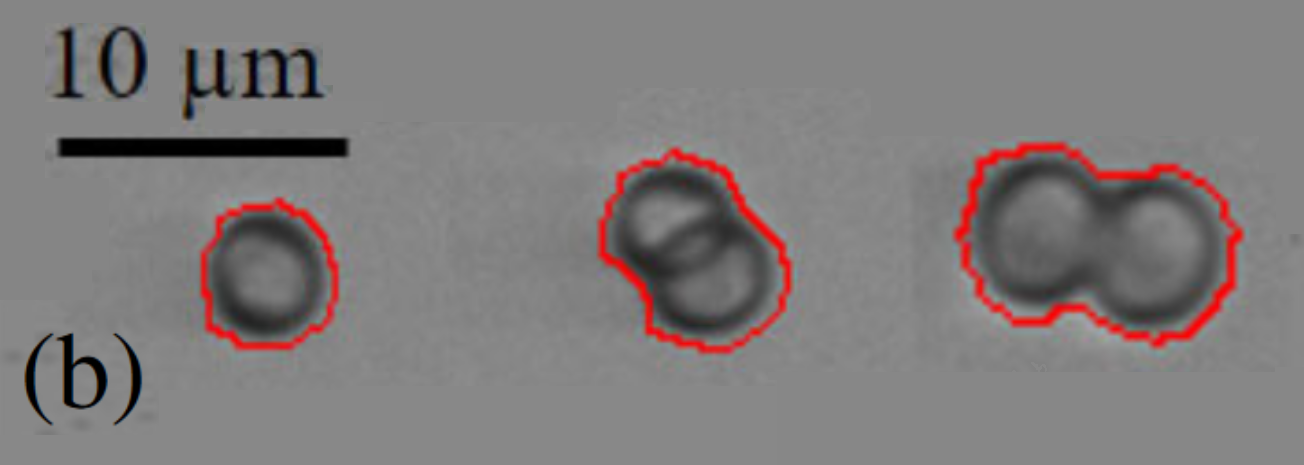
- Crocosphaera (automated identification of singlet and doublet cells)

Scientific classification
- Domain: Bacteria
- Kingdom: Bacillati
- Phylum: Cyanobacteriota
- Class: Cyanophyceae
- Order: Chroococcales
- Family: Aphanothecaceae
- Genus: Crocosphaera
- Species: C. watsonii

Binomial name
- Crocosphaera watsonii Zehr et al. 2019

= Crocosphaera watsonii =

Species of bacterium

Crocosphaera watsonii (strain WH8501) is an isolate of a species of unicellular (2.5-6 μm diameter) diazotrophic marine cyanobacteria which represent less than 0.1% of the marine microbial population. They thrive in offshore, open-ocean oligotrophic regions where the waters are warmer than 24 degrees Celsius. Crocosphaera watsonii cell density can exceed 1,000 cells per milliliter within the euphotic zone; however, their growth may be limited by the concentration of phosphorus. Crocosphaera watsonii are able to contribute to the oceanic carbon and nitrogen budgets in tropical oceans due to their size, abundance, and rapid growth rate. Crocosphaera watsonii are unicellular nitrogen fixers that fix atmospheric nitrogen to ammonia during the night and contribute to new nitrogen in the oceans. They are a major source of nitrogen to open-ocean systems. Nitrogen fixation is important in the oceans as it not only allows phytoplankton to continue growing when nitrogen and ammonium are in very low supply but it also replenishes other forms of nitrogen, thus fertilizing the ocean and allowing more phytoplankton growth.

== Diel rhythm ==
Diazotrophic cyanobacteria have evolved a number of mechanisms to ensure that oxygen doesn't interfere with the oxygen-sensitive enzyme complex responsible for nitrogen fixation, since these enzymes are sensitive to oxygen. Oxygen is especially toxic to nitrogenase. One way in which nitrogen-fixing cyanobacteria, such as those in the genera "Nostoc" and "Anabaena", avoid oxygen toxicity is through specialized cells called heterocysts that lack photosystem II and hence do not have oxygen evolution. As a diazotrophic cyanobacterium that has oxygen-evolving photosystem II, one of the ways by which Crocosphaera watsonii protects its nitrogenase from oxygen is through the adaptation of a diel rhythm. This temporally separates carbon and nitrogen metabolism between day and night, respectively. Since an array of enzymes are involved in the regulation of carbon and nitrogen metabolism, this separation entails temporal regulation of many enzymes and processes in these bacteria. Consistent with this, many genes involved in nitrogen fixation and photosynthesis show variation in transcription between day and night. This difference in gene expression between light and dark periods for genes involved in nitrogen fixation was about ten times bigger than for genes involved in photosynthesis, suggesting more stable photosystems compared to nitrogenase in these bacteria. The expression of many genes involved in nitrogen fixation and photosynthesis have been individually monitored. These include genes encoding the proteins nifH, nifX, glutamate synthetase, ntcA, glnB-like proteins and glgP, all of which have essential roles in nitrogen fixation. The expression of all these genes were at their peak at the beginning of dark period and were at their minimum in the early light period. Furthermore, genes encoding for photosynthetic proteins such as photosystem I subunit VII (psaC), the photosystem II D1 protein (psbA1) and the photosystem II oxygen-evolving complex protein (psbO), and glgA showed diel variation in expression, with the highest and lowest expression at daytime and nighttime, respectively. About 30% of the genome of Crocosphaera watsonii showed diel variation in expression, indicating its importance. All of these patterns indicate a temporal separation of photosynthesis and nitrogen fixation in Crocosphaera watsonii.

== Photosystem II blockage ==
Another method by which Crocosphaera watsonii protects its nitrogen fixing enzyme complexes, which is unique to this species, is through its ability to shut down photosystem II. When cultures of Crocosphaera watsonii are exposed to varying light regimes the diel light:dark cycle regulating nitrogen fixation is disrupted. Because diazotrophs are able to fix nitrogen in the presence of light, especially during the times of transition from light to dark periods, there must be other methods by which they protect themselves in the presence of oxygen. Crocosphaera watsonii does this by tightly constraining oxygen evolution in several ways. It has the ability to shut down photosystem II mechanisms in dark periods by reducing its own plastoquinone pool. Plastoquinone (PQ) is an essential protein in the electron transfer system, and by limiting the amount of plastoquinone available, Photosystem II is essentially shut down. The cell accomplishes this by changing the redox state of plastoquinone in the dark. Crocosphaera watsonii also slows its electron transfer rate closer to the dark period, and the cell transitions itself to shut down its photosystem. Phycobilisomes, which are light harvesting complexes for photosystem II are also shown to attach to photosystem I during the night period, adding a further layer of protection to its nitrogen fixing machinery. Another method of temporarily disabling photosystem II that Crocosphaera watsonii employs is the deactivation of the D1 protein. The D1 protein forms the reaction center of photosystem II and is important as it binds chlorophyll. By mutating and thus deactivating D1, photosystem II is also shut down, allowing nitrogen fixation to occur. Regulating photosystem II in Crocosphaera watsonii is a fast process, and it can be inactivated or activated immediately when needed. The recycling of the same iron molecules in both photosynthesis and nitrogen fixation also helps enforce the diel cycle of photosynthesis and nitrogen fixation.

== Iron salvage ==
Crocosphaera watsonii, which contributes significantly to oceanic nitrogen fixation, is limited by iron as is also the case for other marine diazotrophs. The reason for this is that the enzyme responsible for nitrogen fixation in diazotrophs, nitrogenase, uses iron as a cofactor. To overcome the challenge of iron scarcity, Crocosphaera watsonii has come up with a unique mechanism that involves reduction of metalloenzyme inventories. In this mechanism, the metalloenzyme will be synthesized only when needed and will be degraded as soon as they are no longer needed, and in the process the associated iron is recycled. In this way, less iron is taken up unnecessarily by the metalloenzyme when it is inactive, and the iron can be used in other processes such as nitrogen fixation by nitrogenase. This mechanism reduces the iron requirement of Crocosphaera watsonii by up to 75%, but it costs energy. This energy is provided by high-energy carbon molecules produced during the light period via photosynthesis.

Moreover, it has been demonstrated that Crocosphaera watsonii adapts to iron deprivation by reducing its biovolume and its growth rate.

== Phosphorus limitation ==
Another limitation that Crocosphaera watsonii encounters is phosphorus limitation. Because Crocosphaera watsonii lives in oligotrophic waters, it can be limited by a variety of nutrients, including dissolved inorganic phosphate. Phosphate is required in many cellular processes including photosynthesis where it is an integral part of its machinery. Phosphorus is also a key requirement for nitrogen fixation. By looking at the response of Crocosphaera watsonii to phosphorus limitation, the effects on nitrogen fixation can also be examined. Crocosphaera watsonii showed a decrease in photosynthetic efficiency when limited by phosphorus. Unlike most cyanobacteria, Crocosphaera watsonii does not regulate its phosphate use and metabolism inside the cell during low phosphate conditions. Instead, Crocosphaera watsonii uses pstS, a protein that has a high affinity to bind to phosphorus. During times of phosphorus stress, Crocosphaera watsonii is shown to have increased levels of pstS transcription. This is the defensive response of Crocosphaera watsonii to lower levels of phosphorus, for more efficient uptake. While increasing pstS levels correspond to a lower concentrations of phosphorus around cells, pstS transcript concentrations have no relationship to phosphorus concentrations. PstS transcript levels in Crocosphaera watsonii instead correspond to the diel cycle, peaking at the end of the light phase. Another method to measure phosphorus stress in Crocosphaera watsonii is to look at arsenic concentrations within the cell. As phosphorus is limited, arsenic is also accumulated inside the cell. As a response, Crocosphaera watsonii will upregulate arsB levels, which will remove the excess arsenic from within the cell. These, when looked at together can tell us the condition of the cells in a given Crocosphaera watsonii population.
