= History of genetics =

The history of genetics dates from the classical era with contributions by Pythagoras, Hippocrates, Aristotle, Epicurus, and others. Modern genetics began with the work of the Augustinian friar Gregor Johann Mendel. His works on pea plants, published in 1866, provided the initial evidence that, on its rediscovery in the 1900s, helped to establish the theory of Mendelian inheritance.

In ancient Greece, Hippocrates suggested that all organs of the body of a parent gave off invisible "seeds", miniaturised components that were transmitted during sexual intercourse and combined in the mother's womb to form a baby. In the early modern period, William Harvey's book On Animal Generation contradicted Aristotle's theories of genetics and embryology.

The 1900 rediscovery of Mendel's work by Hugo de Vries, Carl Correns and Erich von Tschermak led to rapid advances in genetics. By 1915 the basic principles of Mendelian genetics had been studied in a wide variety of organisms – most notably the fruit fly Drosophila melanogaster. Led by Thomas Hunt Morgan and his fellow "drosophilists", geneticists developed the Mendelian model, which was widely accepted by 1925. Alongside experimental work, mathematicians developed the statistical framework of population genetics, bringing genetic explanations into the study of evolution.

With the basic patterns of genetic inheritance established, many biologists turned to investigations of the physical nature of the gene. In the 1940s and early 1950s, experiments pointed to DNA as the portion of chromosomes (and perhaps other nucleoproteins) that held genes. A focus on new model organisms such as viruses and bacteria, along with the discovery of the double helical structure of DNA in 1953, marked the transition to the era of molecular genetics.

In the following years, chemists developed techniques for sequencing both nucleic acids and proteins, while many others worked out the relationship between these two forms of biological molecules and discovered the genetic code. The regulation of gene expression became a central issue in the 1960s; by the 1970s gene expression could be controlled and manipulated through genetic engineering. In the last decades of the 20th century, many biologists focused on large-scale genetics projects, such as sequencing entire genomes.

== Pre-Mendel ideas on heredity ==
=== Ancient theories ===
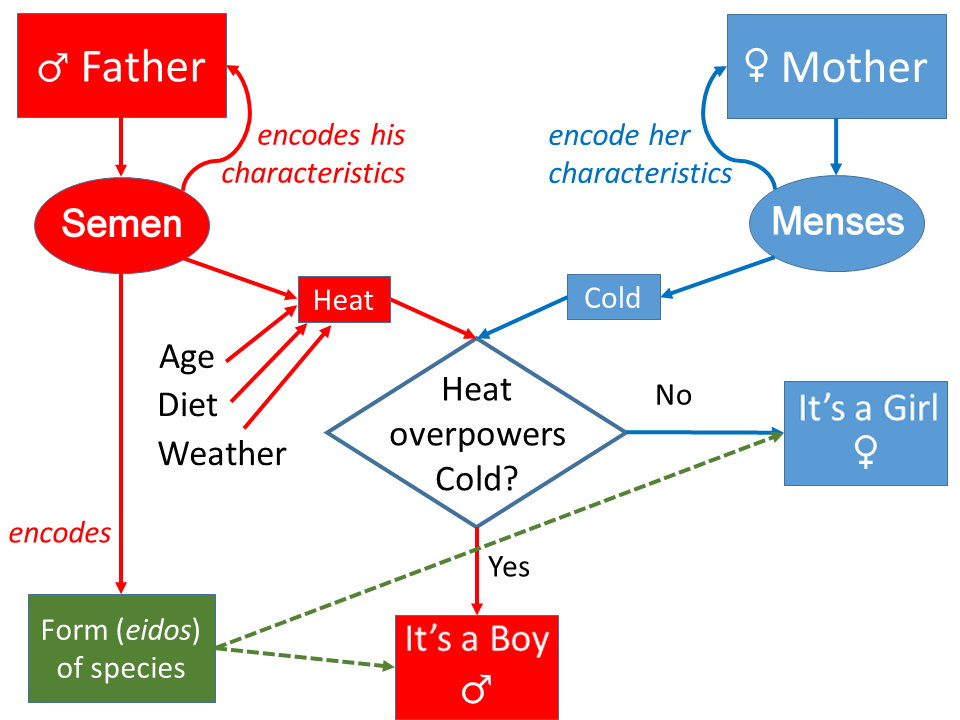
Aristotle's model of transmission of movements from parents to child, and of form from the father. The model is not fully symmetric.

The most influential early theories of heredity were that of Hippocrates and Aristotle. Hippocrates' theory (possibly based on the teachings of Anaxagoras) was similar to Darwin's later ideas on pangenesis, involving heredity material that collects from throughout the body. Aristotle suggested instead that the (nonphysical) form-giving principle of an organism was transmitted through semen (which he considered to be a purified form of blood) and the mother's menstrual blood, which interacted in the womb to direct an organism's early development. For both Hippocrates and Aristotle—and nearly all Western scholars through to the late 19th century—the inheritance of acquired characters was a supposedly well-established fact that any adequate theory of heredity had to explain. At the same time, individual species were taken to have a fixed essence; such inherited changes were merely superficial. The Athenian philosopher Epicurus observed families and proposed the contribution of both males and females of hereditary characters ("sperm atoms"), noticed dominant and recessive types of inheritance and described segregation and independent assortment of "sperm atoms".

The Roman poet and philosopher Lucretius describes heredity in his work "De rerum natura".

From this semen, Venus produces a varied variety of characteristics and reproduces ancestral traits of expression, voice or hair; These features, as well as our faces, bodies, and limbs, are also determined by the specific semen of our relatives.

Similarly, Marcus Terentius Varro in "Rerum rusticarum libri tres" and Publius Vergilius Maro propose that wasps and bees originate from animals like horses, calves, and donkeys, with wasps coming from horses and bees from calves or donkeys.

In 1000 CE, the Arab physician, Abu al-Qasim al-Zahrawi (known as Albucasis in the West) was the first physician to describe clearly the hereditary nature of haemophilia in his Al-Tasrif. In 1140 CE, Judah HaLevi described dominant and recessive genetic traits in The Kuzari.

=== Preformation theory ===
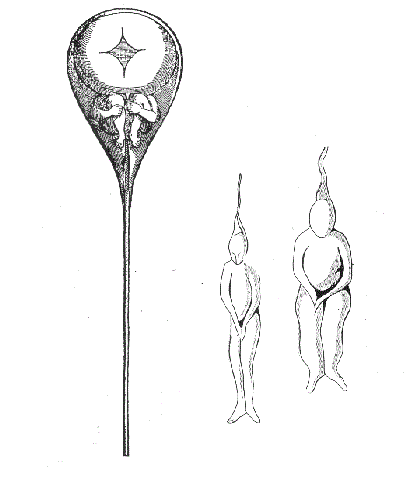
Sperms as preformed humans. Painting of Nicolaas Hartsoeker 1695

The preformation theory is a developmental biological theory, which was represented in antiquity by the Greek philosopher Anaxagoras. It reappeared in modern times in the 17th century and then prevailed until the 19th century. Another common term at that time was the theory of evolution, although "evolution" (in the sense of development as a pure growth process) had a completely different meaning than today. The preformists assumed that the entire organism was preformed in the sperm (animalkulism) or in the egg (ovism or ovulism) and only had to unfold and grow. This was contrasted by the theory of epigenesis, according to which the structures and organs of an organism only develop in the course of individual development (Ontogeny). Epigenesis had been the dominant opinion since antiquity and into the 17th century, but was then replaced by preformist ideas. Since the 19th century epigenesis was again able to establish itself as a view valid to this day.

=== Plant systematics and hybridisation ===
In the 18th century, with increased knowledge of plant and animal diversity and the accompanying increased focus on taxonomy, new ideas about heredity began to appear. Linnaeus and others (among them Joseph Gottlieb Kölreuter, Carl Friedrich von Gärtner, and Charles Naudin) conducted extensive experiments with hybridisation, especially hybrids between species. Species hybridisers described a wide variety of inheritance phenomena, include hybrid sterility and the high variability of back-crosses.

Plant breeders were also developing an array of stable varieties in many important plant species. In the early 19th century, Augustin Sageret established the concept of dominance, recognising that when some plant varieties are crossed, certain characteristics (present in one parent) usually appear in the offspring; he also found that some ancestral characteristics found in neither parent may appear in offspring. However, plant breeders made little attempt to establish a theoretical foundation for their work or to share their knowledge with current work of physiology, although Gartons Agricultural Plant Breeders in England explained their system.

== Mendel ==
Blending Inheritance

Between 1856 and 1865, Gregor Mendel conducted breeding experiments using the pea plant Pisum sativum and traced the inheritance patterns of certain traits. Through these experiments, Mendel saw that the genotypes and phenotypes of the progeny were predictable and that some traits were dominant over others. These patterns of Mendelian inheritance demonstrated the usefulness of applying statistics to inheritance. They also contradicted 19th-century theories of blending inheritance, showing, rather, that genes remain discrete through multiple generations of hybridisation.

From his statistical analysis, Mendel defined a concept that he described as a character (which in his mind holds also for "determinant of that character"). In only one sentence of his historical paper, he used the term "factors" to designate the "material creating" the character: " So far as experience goes, we find it in every case confirmed that constant progeny can only be formed when the egg cells and the fertilising pollen are off like the character so that both are provided with the material for creating quite similar individuals, as is the case with the normal fertilisation of pure species. We must, therefore, regard it as certain that exactly similar factors must be at work also in the production of the constant forms in the hybrid plants."(Mendel, 1866).

Mendelian inheritance states characteristics are discrete and are inherited by the parents. This image depicts a monohybrid cross and shows 3 generations: P1 generation (1), F1 generation (2), and F2 generation (3). Each organism inherits two alleles, one from each parent, that make up the genotype. The observed characteristic, the phenotype, is determined by the dominant allele in the genotype. In this monohybrid cross the dominant allele encodes for the colour red and the recessive allele encodes for the colour white.

Mendel's work was published in 1866 as "Versuche über Pflanzen-Hybriden" (Experiments on Plant Hybridisation) in the Verhandlungen des Naturforschenden Vereins zu Brünn (Proceedings of the Natural History Society of Brünn), following two lectures he gave on the work in early 1865.

== Post-Mendel, pre-rediscovery ==
=== Pangenesis ===
Diagram of Charles Darwin's pangenesis theory. Every part of the body emits tiny particles, gemmules, which migrate to the gonads and contribute to the fertilised egg and so to the next generation. The theory implied that changes to the body during an organism's life would be inherited, as proposed in Lamarckism.

Mendel's work was published in a relatively obscure scientific journal, and it was not given any attention in the scientific community. Instead, discussions about modes of heredity were galvanised by Darwin's theory of evolution by natural selection, in which mechanisms of non-Lamarckian heredity seemed to be required. Darwin's own theory of heredity, pangenesis, did not meet with any large degree of acceptance. A more mathematical version of pangenesis, one which dropped much of Darwin's Lamarckian holdovers, was developed as the "biometrical" school of heredity by Darwin's cousin, Francis Galton.

=== Germ plasm ===
August Weismann's germ plasm theory. The hereditary material, the germ plasm, is confined to the gonads. Somatic cells (of the body) develop afresh in each generation from the germ plasm.

In 1883 August Weismann conducted experiments involving breeding mice whose tails had been surgically removed. His results — that surgically removing a mouse's tail had no effect on the tail of its offspring — challenged the theories of pangenesis and Lamarckism, which held that changes to an organism during its lifetime could be inherited by its descendants. Weismann proposed the germ plasm theory of inheritance, which held that hereditary information was carried only in sperm and egg cells.

== Rediscovery of Mendel ==
Hugo de Vries wondered what the nature of germ plasm might be, and in particular he wondered whether or not germ plasm was mixed like paint or whether the information was carried in discrete packets that remained unbroken. In the 1890s, he was conducting breeding experiments with a variety of plant species, and in 1897, he published a paper on his results that stated that each inherited trait was governed by two discrete particles of information, one from each parent, and that these particles were passed along intact to the next generation. In 1900, he was preparing another paper on his further results when he was shown a copy of Mendel's 1866 paper by a friend who thought it might be relevant to de Vries's work. He went ahead and published his 1900 paper without mentioning Mendel's priority. Later that same year, another botanist, Carl Correns, who had been conducting hybridisation experiments with maize and peas, was searching the literature for related experiments prior to publishing his own results when he came across Mendel's paper, which had results similar to his own. Correns accused de Vries of appropriating terminology from Mendel's paper without crediting him or recognising his priority. At the same time, another botanist, Erich von Tschermak was experimenting with pea breeding and producing results like Mendel's. He too discovered Mendel's paper while searching the literature for relevant work. In a subsequent paper de Vries praised Mendel and acknowledged that he had only extended his earlier work.

== Emergence of molecular genetics ==
After the rediscovery of Mendel's work there was a feud between William Bateson and Pearson over the hereditary mechanism, solved by Ronald Fisher in his work "The Correlation Between Relatives on the Supposition of Mendelian Inheritance".

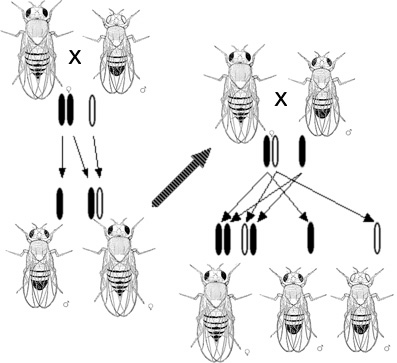
Thomas Hunt Morgan discovered sex linked inheritance of the white eyed mutation in the fruit fly Drosophila in 1910, implying the gene was on the sex chromosome.

In 1910, Thomas Hunt Morgan showed that genes reside on specific chromosomes. He later showed that genes occupy specific locations on the chromosome. With this knowledge, Alfred Sturtevant, a member of Morgan's famous fly room, using Drosophila melanogaster, provided the first chromosomal map of any biological organism. In 1928, Frederick Griffith showed that genes could be transferred. In what is now known as Griffith's experiment, injections into a mouse of a deadly strain of bacteria that had been heat-killed transferred genetic information to a safe strain of the same bacteria, killing the mouse.

A series of subsequent discoveries (e.g.) led to the realization decades later that the genetic material is made of DNA (deoxyribonucleic acid) and not, as was widely believed until then, of proteins. In 1941, George Wells Beadle and Edward Lawrie Tatum showed that mutations in genes caused errors in specific steps of metabolic pathways. This showed that specific genes code for specific proteins, leading to the "one gene, one enzyme" hypothesis. Oswald Avery, Colin Munro MacLeod, and Maclyn McCarty showed in 1944 that DNA holds the gene's information. In 1952, Rosalind Franklin and Raymond Gosling produced a strikingly clear x-ray diffraction pattern indicating a helical form. Using these x-rays and information already known about the chemistry of DNA, James D. Watson and Francis Crick demonstrated the molecular structure of DNA in 1953. Together, these discoveries established the central dogma of molecular biology, which states that proteins are translated from RNA which is transcribed by DNA. This dogma has since been shown to have exceptions, such as reverse transcription in retroviruses.

In 1947, Salvador Luria discovered the reactivation of irradiated phage leading to many further studies on the fundamental processes of repair of DNA damage (for review of early studies, see). In 1958, Meselson and Stahl demonstrated that DNA replicates semiconservatively, leading to the understanding that each of the individual strands in double-stranded DNA serves as a template for new strand synthesis. In 1960, Jacob and collaborators discovered the operon which consists of a sequence of genes whose expression is coordinated by operator DNA. In the period 1961 – 1967, through work in several different labs, the nature of the genetic code was determined (e.g.).

In 1972, Walter Fiers and his team at the University of Ghent were the first to determine the sequence of a gene: the gene for bacteriophage MS2 coat protein. Richard J. Roberts and Phillip Sharp discovered in 1977 that genes can be split into segments. This led to the idea that one gene can make several proteins. The successful sequencing of many organisms' genomes has complicated the molecular definition of the gene. In particular, genes do not always sit side by side on DNA like discrete beads. Instead, regions of the DNA producing distinct proteins may overlap, so that the idea emerges that "genes are one long continuum". It was first hypothesised in 1986 by Walter Gilbert that neither DNA nor protein would be required in such a primitive system as that of a very early stage of the earth if RNA could serve both as a catalyst and as genetic information storage processor.

The modern study of genetics at the level of DNA is known as molecular genetics, and the synthesis of molecular genetics with traditional Darwinian evolution is known as the modern evolutionary synthesis.

== See also ==
- List of sequenced eukaryotic genomes
- History of molecular biology
- History of RNA Biology
- History of evolutionary thought
- One gene-one enzyme hypothesis
- Phage group
