= Outline of genetics =

Hierarchical outline list of articles related to genetics

The following outline is provided as an overview of and topical guide to genetics:

Genetics – science of genes, heredity, and variation in living organisms. Genetics deals with the molecular structure and function of genes, and gene behavior in context of a cell or organism (e.g. dominance and epigenetics), patterns of inheritance from parent to offspring, and gene distribution, variation and change in populations.

== Introduction to genetics ==
- Introduction to genetics
  - Genetics
    - Chromosome
    - DNA
    - Genetic diversity
    - Genetic drift
    - Genetic variation
    - Genome
    - Heredity
    - Mutation
    - Nucleotide
    - RNA
  - Introduction to evolution
    - Evolution
    - Modern evolutionary synthesis
    - Transmutation of species
    - Natural selection
    - Extinction
    - Adaptation
    - Polymorphism (biology)
    - Gene flow
    - Biodiversity
    - Biogeography
    - Phylogenetic tree
    - Taxonomy (biology)
    - Mendelian inheritance
    - Molecular evolution

== Branches of genetics ==
- Classical genetics
- Cytogenetics
- Developmental genetics
- Conservation genetics
- Ecological genetics
- Epigenetics
- Evolutionary genetics
- Genetic engineering
  - Metagenics
- Genetic epidemiology
  - Archaeogenetics
    - Archaeogenetics of the Near East
- Genetics of intelligence
- Genetic testing
- Genomics
- Human genetics
  - Human evolutionary genetics
  - Human mitochondrial genetics
- Medical genetics
  - Immunogenetics
- Microbial genetics
- Molecular genetics
- Neurogenetics
- Population genetics
- Plant genetics
- Psychiatric genetics
- Quantitative genetics
- Statistical genetics

=== Multi-disciplinary fields that include genetics ===
- Evolutionary anthropology

== History of genetics ==
History of genetics

=== Natural history of genetics ===
- History of molecular evolution
- Cladistics
- Transitional fossil
- Extinction event
- Timeline of the evolutionary history of life

=== History of the science of genetics ===
History of genetics

- Ancient Concepts of Heredity
- Experiments on Plant Hybridization
- History of evolutionary thought
- History of genetic engineering
- History of genomics
- History of paleontology
- History of plant systematics
- Neanderthal genome project
- Timeline of paleontology

== General genetics concepts ==
- Haplogroup
  - Human Y-chromosome DNA haplogroup
  - Human mitochondrial DNA haplogroup
- Eugenics
  - History of eugenics
  - Eugenics Record Office
- Molecules
  - amino acids
  - Nucleobase
    - Adenine
    - Cytosine
    - Guanine
    - Thymine
    - Uracil
- Adenovirus
- Antibody
- Bacteria
- Codon
- Deoxyribonucleic acid (DNA)
- Messenger RNA
  - mRNA
- Enzyme
- Exon
- Intron
- nucleotide
- allele
- animal model
- antisense
- apoptosis
- autosomal dominant
- autosome
- bacterial artificial chromosome (BAC)
- base pair
- birth defect
- bone marrow transplantation
- cancer
- candidate gene
- carcinoma
- carrier
- cDNA library
- cell
- centimorgan
- centromere
- chromosome
- chromosomal translocation
- cloning
- congenital disorder
- contig
- craniosynostosis
- cystic fibrosis
- cytogenetic map
- deletion
- diabetes mellitus
- diploid
- DNA replication
- DNA sequencing
- dominant
- double helix
- duplication
- electrophoresis
- fibroblasts
- fluorescence in situ hybridization (FISH)
- gene
- gene amplification
- gene expression
- gene library
- gene mapping
- gene pool
- gene therapy
- gene transfer
- genetic code
  - ATGC
- genetic counseling
- genetic linkage
- genetic map
- genetic marker
- genetic screening
- genome
- genotype
- germ line
- haploid
- haploinsufficiency
- hematopoietic stem cell
- heterozygous
- highly conserved sequence
- holoprosencephaly
- homologous recombination
- homozygous
- human artificial chromosome (HAC)
- Human Genome Project
- human immunodeficiency virus (HIV)
  - acquired immunodeficiency syndrome (AIDS)
- hybridization
- immunotherapy
- in situ hybridization
- inherited
- insertion
- intellectual property rights
- Jurassic Park (genetics of)
- karyotype
- knockout
- leukemia
- List of human genetic disorders
- locus
- LOD score
- lymphocyte
- malformation
- Gene mapping
- marker
- melanoma
- Mendel, Johann (Gregor)
- Mendelian inheritance
- Metaphase
- microarray technology
- microsatellite
- mitochondrial DNA
- monosomy
- mouse model
- multiple endocrine neoplasia, type 1
  - MEN1)
- mutation
- non-coding DNA
- non-directiveness
- nonsense mutation
- Northern blot
- Nucleic acid sequence
- nucleus
- oligo
- oncogene
- oncovirus
- p53
- Particulate inheritance theory
- patent
- pedigree
- peptide
- phenotype
- physical map
- polydactyly
- polymerase chain reaction (PCR)
- polymorphism
- positional cloning
- primary immunodeficiency
- primer
- probe
- promoter
- pronucleus
- protease
- protein
- pseudogene
- recessive
- recombinant DNA
- repressor
- restriction enzymes
- restriction fragment length polymorphism (RFLP)
- retrovirus
- ribonucleic acid (RNA)
- ribosome
- risk communication
- sequence-tagged site (STS)
- sex chromosome
- sex-linked
- shotgun sequencing
- single-nucleotide polymorphisms (SNPs)
- somatic cells
- Southern blot
- spectral karyotype (SKY)
- substitution
- suicide gene
- syndrome
- technology transfer
- transgenic
- trisomy
- tumor suppressor gene
- vector
- Western blot
- yeast artificial chromosome (YAC)

== Genetic Modification ==
- Genetic engineering
  - Genetic engineering techniques
  - History of genetic engineering
- Genetically modified organism
- Genetically modified food
- Genetically modified crops
- Norman Borlaug

== Genetic research and Darwinism ==
- DNA sequencing
- Medical genetics
- Genomics
- Evolutionary ideas of the Renaissance and Enlightenment
- On the Origin of Species
- Charles Darwin
- The eclipse of Darwinism

== Concepts of Evolution ==
- Common descent
- Evidence of common descent
- Speciation
- Co-operation (evolution)
- Adaptive radiation
- Coevolution
- Divergent evolution
- Convergent evolution
- Parallel evolution
- Evolutionary developmental biology
- Evolutionary biology
- Evolutionary history of life
- Human evolution
- Evolutionary taxonomy

== Geneticists ==
=== Classical geneticists ===
- Gregor Mendel
- Hugo de Vries
- William Bateson
- Thomas Hunt Morgan
- Alfred Sturtevant
- Ronald Fisher
- Frederick Griffith
- Jean Brachet
- Edward Lawrie Tatum
- George Wells Beadle

=== DNA era geneticists ===
- Oswald Theodore Avery
- Colin McLeod
- Erwin Chargaff
- Barbara McClintock
- James Watson
- Francis Crick

=== Genomics era geneticists ===
- Francis Collins
- Walter Fiers
- Eric Lander
- Kary Banks Mullis
- Lap-Chee Tsui
- Frederick Sanger

== Genetics-related organizations ==
- List of genetics research organizations

== See also ==
- Outline of biochemistry
- Outline of biotechnology
