= History of genetic engineering =

Genetic engineering is the science of manipulating genetic material of an organism. The concept of genetic engineering was first proposed by Nikolay Timofeev-Ressovsky in 1934. The first artificial genetic modification accomplished using biotechnology was transgenesis, the process of transferring genes from one organism to another, first accomplished by Herbert Boyer and Stanley Cohen in 1973. It was the result of a series of advancements in techniques that allowed the direct modification of the genome. Important advances included the discovery of restriction enzymes and DNA ligases, the ability to design plasmids and technologies like polymerase chain reaction and sequencing. Transformation of the DNA into a host organism was accomplished with the invention of biolistics, Agrobacterium-mediated recombination and microinjection. The first genetically modified animal was a mouse created in 1974 by Rudolf Jaenisch. In 1976, the technology was commercialised, with the advent of genetically modified bacteria that produced somatostatin, followed by insulin in 1978. In 1983, an antibiotic resistant gene was inserted into tobacco, leading to the first genetically engineered plant. Advances followed that allowed scientists to manipulate and add genes to a variety of different organisms and induce a range of different effects. Plants were first commercialized with virus resistant tobacco released in China in 1992. The first genetically modified food was the Flavr Savr tomato marketed in 1994. By 2010, 29 countries had planted commercialized biotech crops. In 2000 a paper published in Science introduced golden rice, the first food developed with increased nutrient value.

== Agriculture ==
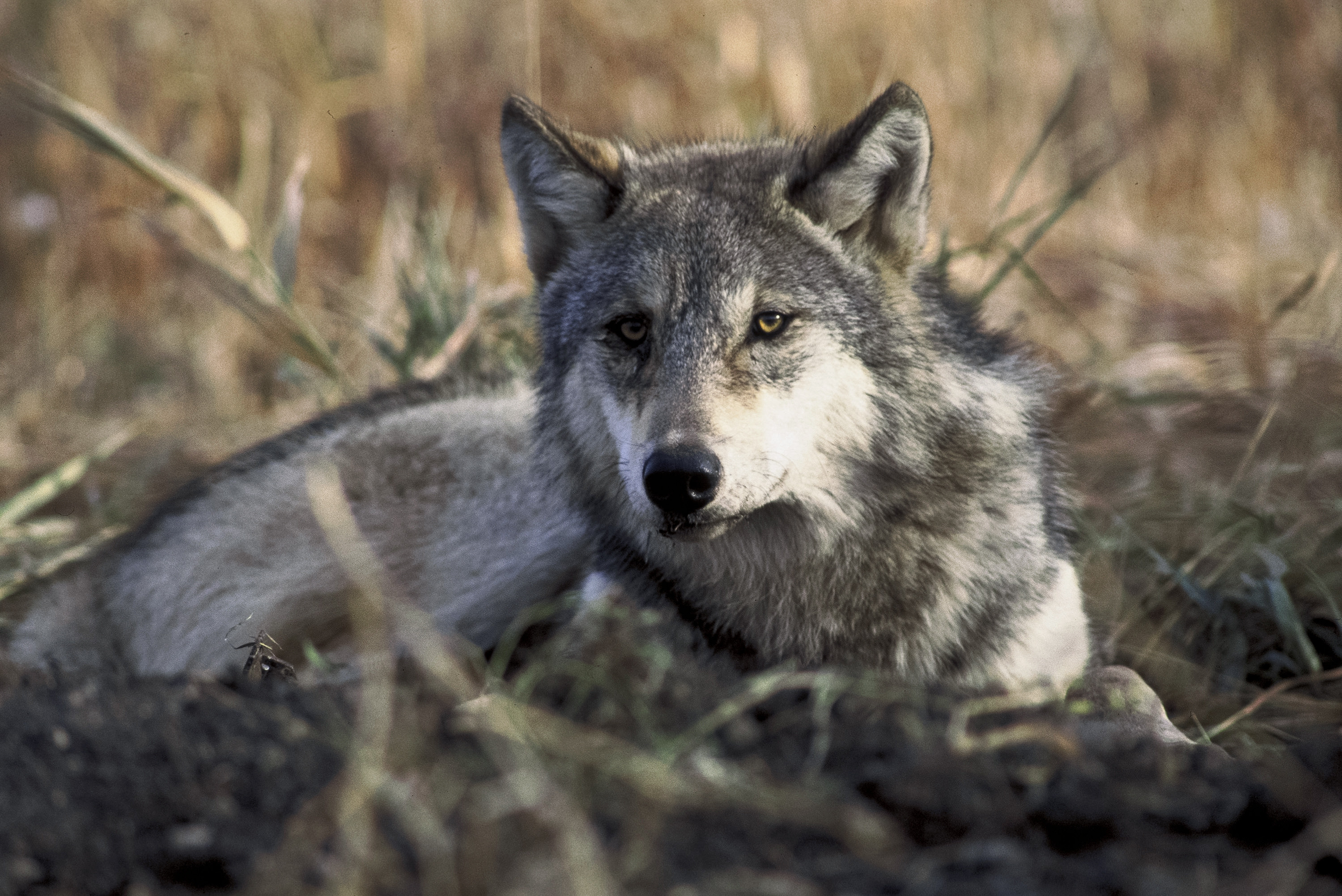
DNA studies suggested that the dog most likely arose from a common ancestor with the grey wolf.

Genetic engineering is the direct manipulation of an organism's genome using certain biotechnology techniques that have only existed since the 1970s. Human directed genetic manipulation was occurring much earlier, beginning with the domestication of plants and animals through artificial selection. The dog is believed to be the first animal domesticated, possibly arising from a common ancestor of the grey wolf, with archeological evidence dating to about 12,000 BC. Other carnivores domesticated in prehistoric times include the cat, which cohabited with human 9,500 years ago. Archeological evidence suggests sheep, cattle, pigs and goats were domesticated between 9,000 BC and 8,000 BC in the Fertile Crescent.

The first evidence of plant domestication comes from emmer and einkorn wheat found in pre-Pottery Neolithic A villages in Southwest Asia dated about 10,500 to 10,100 BC. The Fertile Crescent of Western Asia, Egypt, and India were sites of the earliest planned sowing and harvesting of plants that had previously been gathered in the wild. Independent development of agriculture occurred in northern and southern China, Africa's Sahel, New Guinea and several regions of the Americas. The eight Neolithic founder crops (emmer wheat, einkorn wheat, barley, peas, lentils, bitter vetch, chick peas and flax) had all appeared by about 7,000 BC. Horticulture first appears in the Levant during the Chalcolithic period about 6,800 to 6,300 BC. Due to the soft tissues, archeological evidence for early vegetables is scarce. The earliest vegetable remains have been found in Egyptian caves that date back to the 2nd millennium BC.

Selective breeding of domesticated plants was once the main way early farmers shaped organisms to suit their needs. Charles Darwin described three types of selection: methodical selection, wherein humans deliberately select for particular characteristics; unconscious selection, wherein a characteristic is selected simply because it is desirable; and natural selection, wherein a trait that helps an organism survive better is passed on. Early breeding relied on unconscious and natural selection. The introduction of methodical selection is unknown. Common characteristics that were bred into domesticated plants include grains that did not shatter to allow easier harvesting, uniform ripening, shorter lifespans that translate to faster growing, loss of toxic compounds, and productivity. Some plants, like the Banana, were able to be propagated by vegetative cloning. Offspring often did not contain seeds, and was therefore sterile. However, these offspring were usually juicier and larger. Propagation through cloning allows these mutant varieties to be cultivated despite their lack of seeds.

Hybridization was another way that rapid changes in plant's makeup were introduced. It often increased vigor in plants, and combined desirable traits together. Hybridization most likely first occurred when humans first grew similar, yet slightly different plants in close proximity. Triticum aestivum, wheat used in baking bread, is an allopolyploid. Its creation is the result of two separate hybridization events.

Grafting can transfer chloroplasts, mitochondrial DNA and the entire cell nucleus containing the genome to potentially make a new species making grafting a form of natural genetic engineering.

X-rays were first used to deliberately mutate plants in 1927. Between 1927 and 2007, more than 2,540 genetically mutated plant varieties had been produced using x-rays.

== Genetics ==
Griffith proved the existence of a "transforming principle", which Avery, MacLeod and McCarty later showed to be DNA

Various genetic discoveries have been essential in the development of genetic engineering. Genetic inheritance was first discovered by Gregor Mendel in 1865 following experiments crossing peas. Although largely ignored for 34 years he provided the first evidence of hereditary segregation and independent assortment. In 1889 Hugo de Vries came up with the name "(pan)gene" after postulating that particles are responsible for inheritance of characteristics and the term "genetics" was coined by William Bateson in 1905. In 1928 Frederick Griffith proved the existence of a "transforming principle" involved in inheritance, which Avery, MacLeod and McCarty later (1944) identified as DNA. Edward Lawrie Tatum and George Wells Beadle developed the central dogma that genes code for proteins in 1941. The double helix structure of DNA was identified by James Watson and Francis Crick in 1953.

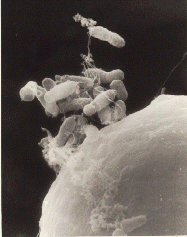
The bacterium Agrobacterium tumefaciens inserts T-DNA into infected plant cells, which is then incorporated into the plants genome.

As well as discovering how DNA works, tools had to be developed that allowed it to be manipulated. In 1970 Hamilton Smith's lab discovered restriction enzymes that allowed DNA to be cut at specific places and separated out on an electrophoresis gel. This enabled scientists to isolate genes from an organism's genome. DNA ligases, that join broken DNA together, had been discovered earlier in 1967 and by combining the two enzymes it was possible to "cut and paste" DNA sequences to create recombinant DNA. Plasmids, discovered in 1952, became important tools for transferring information between cells and replicating DNA sequences. Frederick Sanger developed a method for sequencing DNA in 1977, greatly increasing the genetic information available to researchers. Polymerase chain reaction (PCR), developed by Kary Mullis in 1983, allowed small sections of DNA to be amplified and aided identification and isolation of genetic material.

As well as manipulating the DNA, techniques had to be developed for its insertion (known as transformation) into an organism's genome. Griffiths experiment had already shown that some bacteria had the ability to naturally take up and express foreign DNA. Artificial competence was induced in Escherichia coli in 1970 when Morton Mandel and Akiko Higa showed that it could take up bacteriophage λ after treatment with calcium chloride solution (CaCl_{2}). Two years later, Stanley Cohen showed that CaCl_{2} treatment was also effective for uptake of plasmid DNA. Transformation using electroporation was developed in the late 1980s, increasing the efficiency and bacterial range. In 1907 a bacterium that caused plant tumors, Agrobacterium tumefaciens, was discovered and in the early 1970s the tumor inducing agent was found to be a DNA plasmid called the Ti plasmid. By removing the genes in the plasmid that caused the tumor and adding in novel genes researchers were able to infect plants with A. tumefaciens and let the bacteria insert their chosen DNA into the genomes of the plants.

== Early genetically modified organisms ==
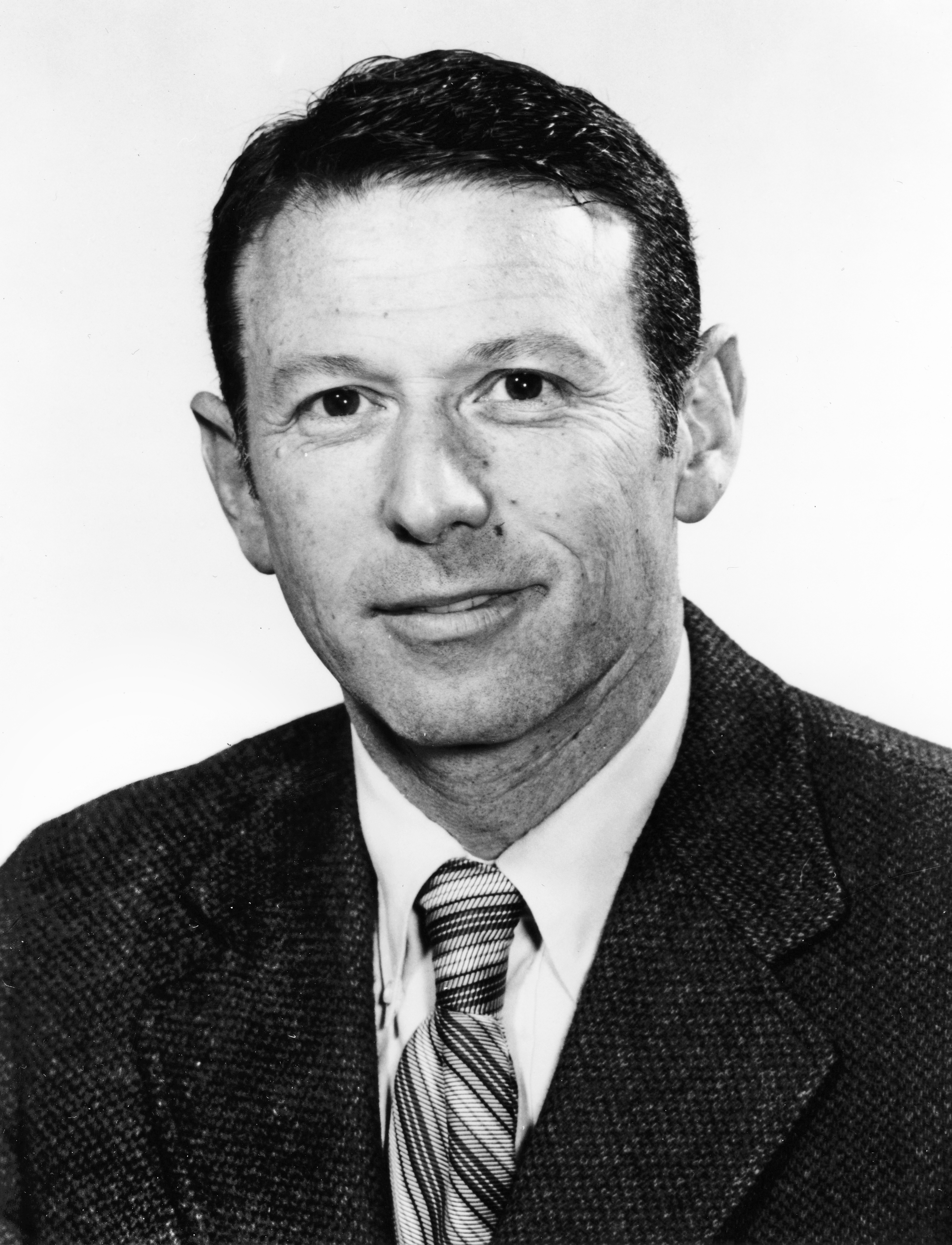
Paul Berg created the first recombinant DNA molecules in 1972.

In 1971 Paul Berg used restriction enzymes and DNA ligases to create the first recombinant DNA molecules. He combined DNA from the monkey virus SV40 with that of the lambda virus. Herbert Boyer and Stanley Norman Cohen took Berg's work a step further and introduced recombinant DNA into a bacterial cell. Cohen was researching plasmids, while Boyers work involved restriction enzymes. They recognised the complementary nature of their work and teamed up in 1972. Together they found a restriction enzyme that cut the pSC101 plasmid at a single point and were able to insert and ligate a gene that conferred resistance to the kanamycin antibiotic into the gap. Cohen had previously devised a method where bacteria could be induced to take up a plasmid and using this they were able to create a bacterium that survived in the presence of the kanamycin. This represented the first genetically modified organism. They repeated experiments showing that other genes could be expressed in bacteria, including one from the toad Xenopus laevis, the first cross kingdom transformation.

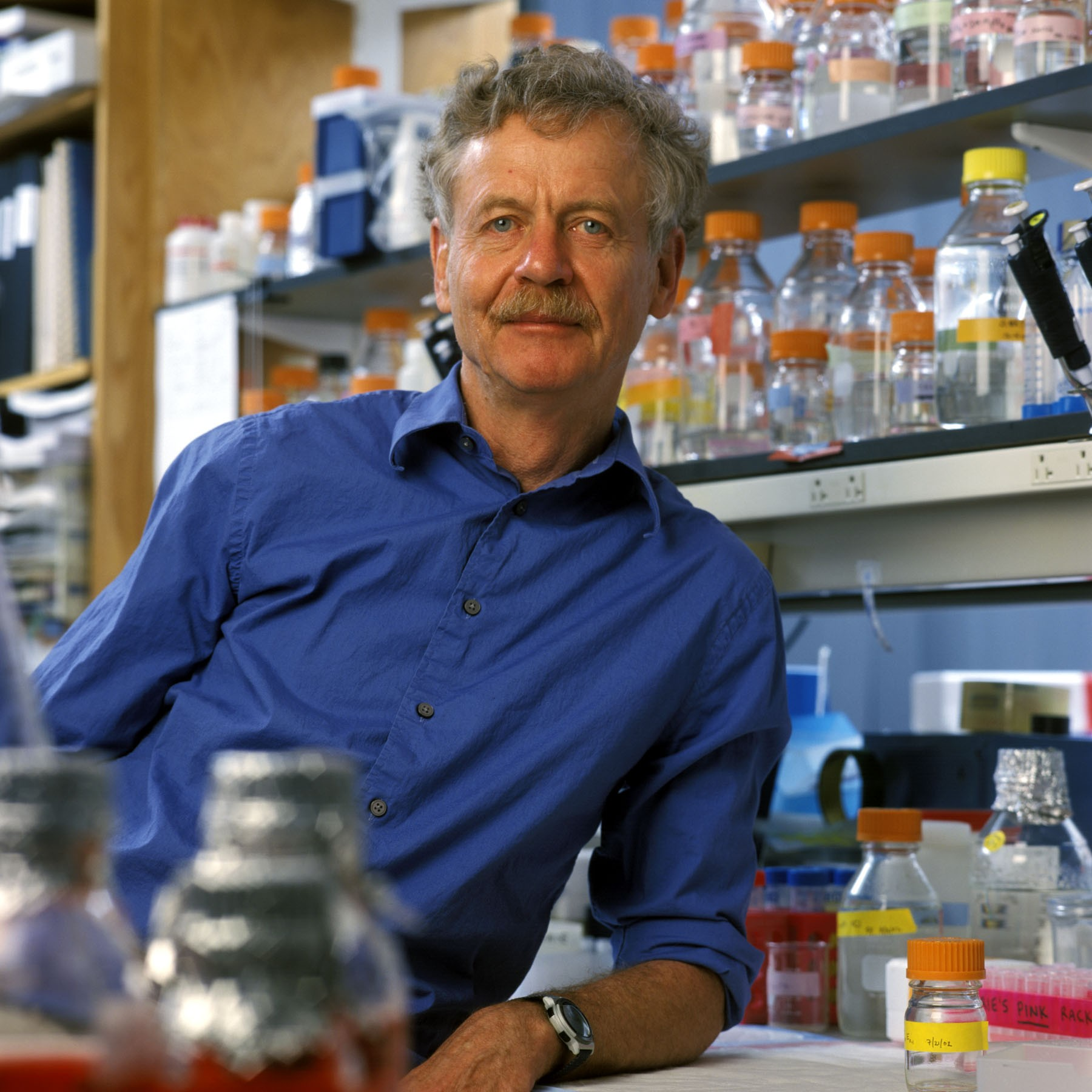
In 1974 Rudolf Jaenisch created the first GM animal.

In 1974 Rudolf Jaenisch created a transgenic mouse by introducing foreign DNA into its embryo, making it the world's first transgenic animal. Jaenisch was studying mammalian cells infected with simian virus 40 (SV40) when he happened to read a paper from Beatrice Mintz describing the generation of chimera mice. He took his SV40 samples to Mintz's lab and injected them into early mouse embryos expecting tumours to develop. The mice appeared normal, but after using radioactive probes he discovered that the virus had integrated itself into the mice genome. However the mice did not pass the transgene to their offspring. In 1981 the laboratories of Frank Ruddle, Frank Constantini and Elizabeth Lacy injected purified DNA into a single-cell mouse embryo and showed transmission of the genetic material to subsequent generations.

The first genetically engineered plant was tobacco, reported in 1983. It was developed by Michael W. Bevan, Richard B. Flavell and Mary-Dell Chilton by creating a chimeric gene that joined an antibiotic resistant gene to the T1 plasmid from Agrobacterium. The tobacco was infected with Agrobacterium transformed with this plasmid resulting in the chimeric gene being inserted into the plant. Through tissue culture techniques a single tobacco cell was selected that contained the gene and a new plant grown from it.

== Regulation ==
The development of genetic engineering technology led to concerns in the scientific community about potential risks. The development of a regulatory framework concerning genetic engineering began in 1975, at Asilomar, California. The Asilomar meeting recommended a set of guidelines regarding the cautious use of recombinant technology and any products resulting from that technology. The Asilomar recommendations were voluntary, but in 1976 the US National Institute of Health (NIH) formed a recombinant DNA advisory committee. This was followed by other regulatory offices (the United States Department of Agriculture (USDA), Environmental Protection Agency (EPA) and Food and Drug Administration (FDA), effectively making all recombinant DNA research tightly regulated in the US.

In 1982 the Organisation for Economic Co-operation and Development (OECD) released a report into the potential hazards of releasing genetically modified organisms into the environment as the first transgenic plants were being developed. As the technology improved and genetically organisms moved from model organisms to potential commercial products the US established a committee at the Office of Science and Technology (OSTP) to develop mechanisms to regulate the developing technology. In 1986 the OSTP assigned regulatory approval of genetically modified plants in the US to the USDA, FDA and EPA. In the late 1980s and early 1990s, guidance on assessing the safety of genetically engineered plants and food emerged from organizations including the FAO and WHO.

The European Union first introduced laws requiring GMO's to be labelled in 1997. In 2013 Connecticut became the first state to enact a labeling law in the US, although it would not take effect until other states followed suit.

== Research and medicine ==
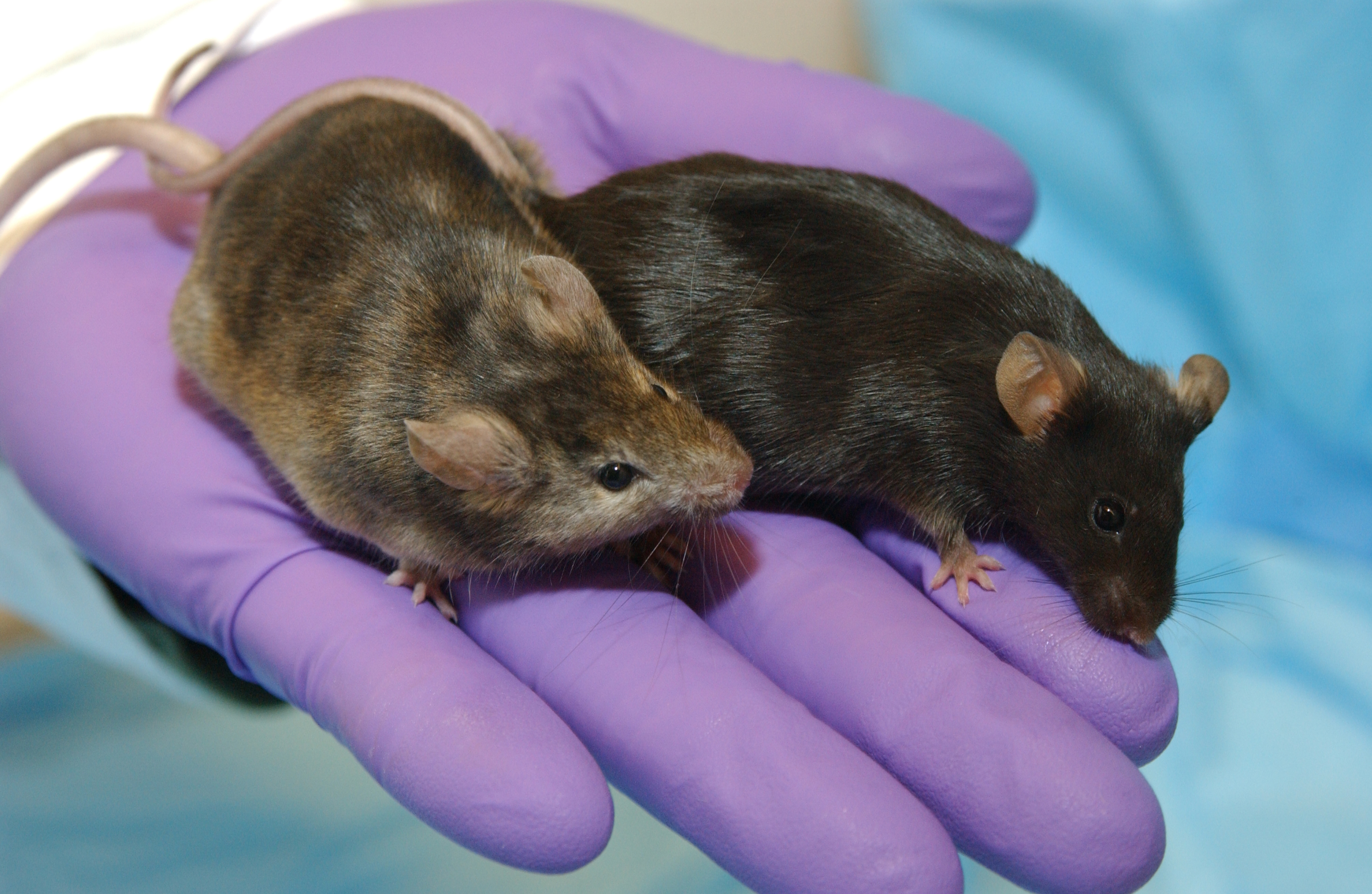
A laboratory mouse in which a gene affecting hair growth has been knocked out (left), is shown next to a normal lab mouse.

The ability to insert, alter or remove genes in model organisms allowed scientists to study the genetic elements of human diseases. Genetically modified mice were created in 1984 that carried cloned oncogenes that predisposed them to developing cancer. The technology has also been used to generate mice with genes knocked out. The first recorded knockout mouse was created by Mario R. Capecchi, Martin Evans and Oliver Smithies in 1989. In 1992 oncomice with tumor suppressor genes knocked out were generated. Creating Knockout rats is much harder and only became possible in 2003.

After the discovery of microRNA in 1993, RNA interference (RNAi) has been used to silence an organism's genes. By modifying an organism to express microRNA targeted to its endogenous genes, researchers have been able to knockout or partially reduce gene function in a range of species. The ability to partially reduce gene function has allowed the study of genes that are lethal when completely knocked out. Other advantages of using RNAi include the availability of inducible and tissue specific knockout. In 2007 microRNA targeted to insect and nematode genes was expressed in plants, leading to suppression when they fed on the transgenic plant, potentially creating a new way to control pests. Targeting endogenous microRNA expression has allowed further fine tuning of gene expression, supplementing the more traditional gene knock out approach.

Genetic engineering has been used to produce proteins derived from humans and other sources in organisms that normally cannot synthesize these proteins. Human insulin-synthesising bacteria were developed in 1979 and were first used as a treatment in 1982. In 1988 the first human antibodies were produced in plants. In 2000 Vitamin A-enriched golden rice, was the first food with increased nutrient value.

== Further advances ==
As not all plant cells were susceptible to infection by A. tumefaciens other methods were developed, including electroporation, micro-injection and particle bombardment with a gene gun (invented in 1987). In the 1980s techniques were developed to introduce isolated chloroplasts back into a plant cell that had its cell wall removed. With the introduction of the gene gun in 1987 it became possible to integrate foreign genes into a chloroplast.

Genetic transformation has become very efficient in some model organisms. In 1998 genetically modified seeds were produced in Arabidopsis thaliana by simply dipping the flowers in an Agrobacterium solution. The range of plants that can be transformed has increased as tissue culture techniques have been developed for different species.

The first transgenic livestock were produced in 1985, by micro-injecting foreign DNA into rabbit, sheep and pig eggs. The first animal to synthesise transgenic proteins in their milk were mice, engineered to produce human tissue plasminogen activator. This technology was applied to sheep, pigs, cows and other livestock.

In 2010 scientists at the J. Craig Venter Institute announced that they had created the first synthetic bacterial genome. The researchers added the new genome to bacterial cells and selected for cells that contained the new genome. To do this the cells undergoes a process called resolution, where during bacterial cell division one new cell receives the original DNA genome of the bacteria, whilst the other receives the new synthetic genome. When this cell replicates it uses the synthetic genome as its template. The resulting bacterium the researchers developed, named Synthia, was the world's first synthetic life form.

In 2014 a bacterium was developed that replicated a plasmid containing an unnatural base pair. This required altering the bacterium so it could import the unnatural nucleotides and then efficiently replicate them. The plasmid retained the unnatural base pairs when it doubled an estimated 99.4% of the time. This is the first organism engineered to use an expanded genetic alphabet.

In 2015 CRISPR and TALENs was used to modify plant genomes. Chinese labs used it to create a fungus-resistant wheat and boost rice yields, while a U.K. group used it to tweak a barley gene that could help produce drought-resistant varieties. When used to precisely remove material from DNA without adding genes from other species, the result is not subject the lengthy and expensive regulatory process associated with GMOs. While CRISPR may use foreign DNA to aid the editing process, the second generation of edited plants contain none of that DNA. Researchers celebrated the acceleration because it may allow them to "keep up" with rapidly evolving pathogens. The U.S. Department of Agriculture stated that some examples of gene-edited corn, potatoes and soybeans are not subject to existing regulations. As of 2016, other review bodies had yet to make statements.

== Commercialisation ==
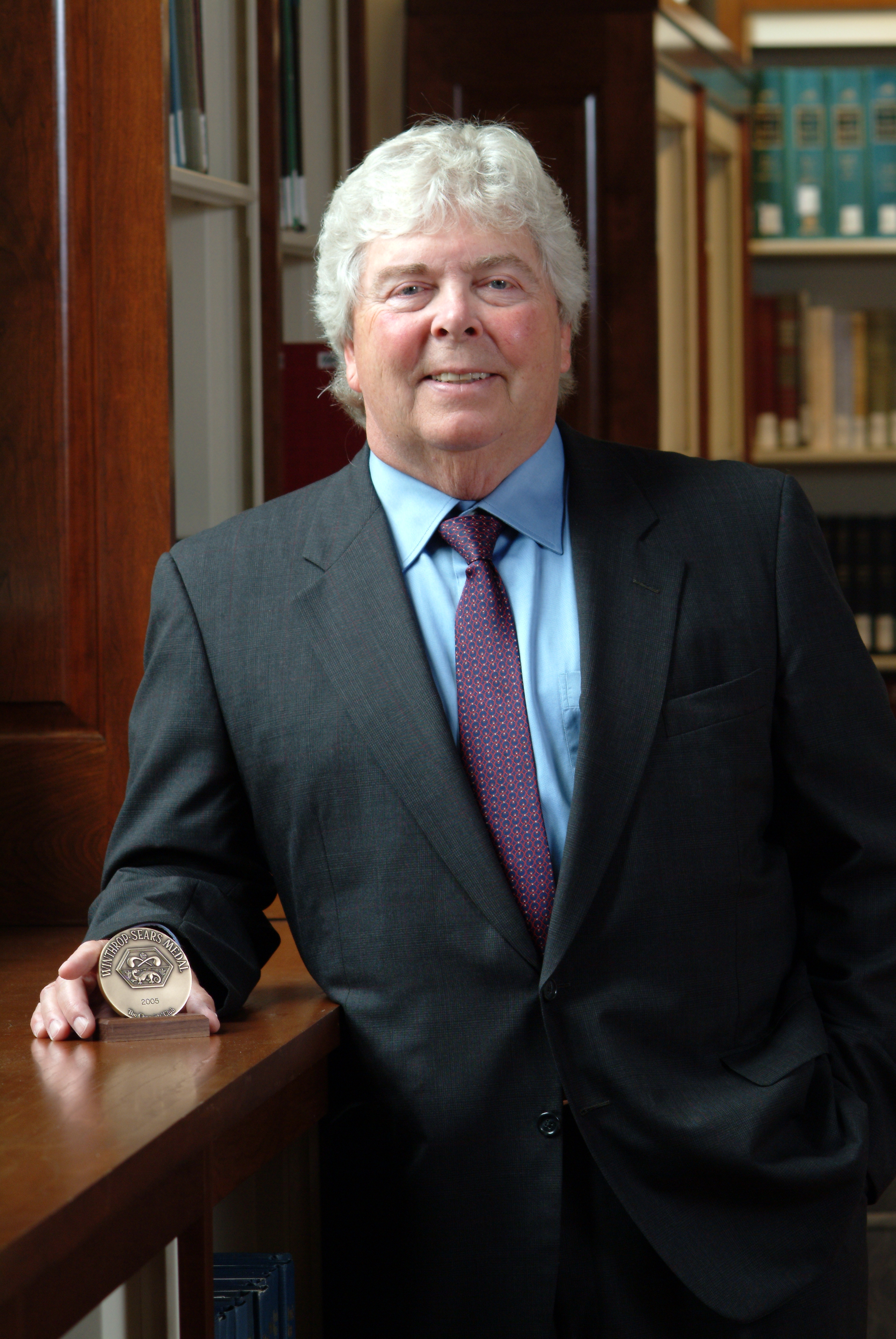
Herbert Boyer helped found the first genetic engineering company in 1976.

In 1976 Genentech, the first genetic engineering company was founded by Herbert Boyer and Robert Swanson and a year later the company produced a human protein (somatostatin) in E.coli. Genentech announced the production of genetically engineered human insulin in 1978. In 1980 the U.S. Supreme Court in the Diamond v. Chakrabarty case ruled that genetically altered life could be patented. The insulin produced by bacteria, branded humulin, was approved for release by the Food and Drug Administration in 1982. In 1983 a biotech company, Advanced Genetic Sciences (AGS) applied for U.S. government authorization to perform field tests with the ice-minus strain of P. syringae to protect crops from frost, but environmental groups and protestors delayed the field tests for four years with legal challenges. In 1987 the ice-minus strain of P. syringae became the first genetically modified organism (GMO) to be released into the environment when a strawberry field and a potato field in California were sprayed with it. Both test fields were attacked by activist groups the night before the tests occurred: "The world's first trial site attracted the world's first field trasher".

The first genetically modified crop plant was produced in 1982, an antibiotic-resistant tobacco plant. The first field trials of genetically engineered plants occurred in France and the US in 1986, tobacco plants were engineered to be resistant to herbicides. In 1987 Plant Genetic Systems, founded by Marc Van Montagu and Jeff Schell, was the first company to genetically engineer insect-resistant plants by incorporating genes that produced insecticidal proteins from Bacillus thuringiensis (Bt) into tobacco.

Genetically modified microbial enzymes were the first application of genetically modified organisms in food production and were approved in 1988 by the US Food and Drug Administration. In the early 1990s, recombinant chymosin was approved for use in several countries. Cheese had typically been made using the enzyme complex rennet that had been extracted from cows' stomach lining. Scientists modified bacteria to produce chymosin, which was also able to clot milk, resulting in cheese curds. The People's Republic of China was the first country to commercialize transgenic plants, introducing a virus-resistant tobacco in 1992. In 1994 Calgene attained approval to commercially release the Flavr Savr tomato, a tomato engineered to have a longer shelf life. Also in 1994, the European Union approved tobacco engineered to be resistant to the herbicide bromoxynil, making it the first genetically engineered crop commercialized in Europe. In 1995 Bt Potato was approved safe by the Environmental Protection Agency, after having been approved by the FDA, making it the first pesticide producing crop to be approved in the US. In 1996 a total of 35 approvals had been granted to commercially grow 8 transgenic crops and one flower crop (carnation), with 8 different traits in 6 countries plus the EU.

By 2010, 29 countries had planted commercialized biotech crops and a further 31 countries had granted regulatory approval for transgenic crops to be imported. In 2013 Robert Fraley (Monsanto's executive vice president and chief technology officer), Marc Van Montagu and Mary-Dell Chilton were awarded the World Food Prize for improving the "quality, quantity or availability" of food in the world.

The first genetically modified animal to be commercialised was the GloFish, a Zebra fish with a fluorescent gene added that allows it to glow in the dark under ultraviolet light. The first genetically modified animal to be approved for food use was AquAdvantage salmon in 2015. The salmon were transformed with a growth hormone-regulating gene from a Pacific Chinook salmon and a promoter from an ocean pout enabling it to grow year-round instead of only during spring and summer.

== Opposition ==
Opposition and support for the use of genetic engineering has existed since the technology was developed. After Arpad Pusztai went public with research he was conducting in 1998 the public opposition to genetically modified food increased. Opposition continued following controversial and publicly debated papers published in 1999 and 2013 that claimed negative environmental and health impacts from genetically modified crops.

== Sources ==
- Zohary, Daniel; Hopf, Maria; Weiss, Ehud (1 March 2012). Domestication of Plants in the Old World: The Origin and Spread of Domesticated Plants in Southwest Asia, Europe, and the Mediterranean Basin. OUP Oxford. ISBN 978-0-19-954906-1.
