= Hershey–Chase experiment =

DNA experiment

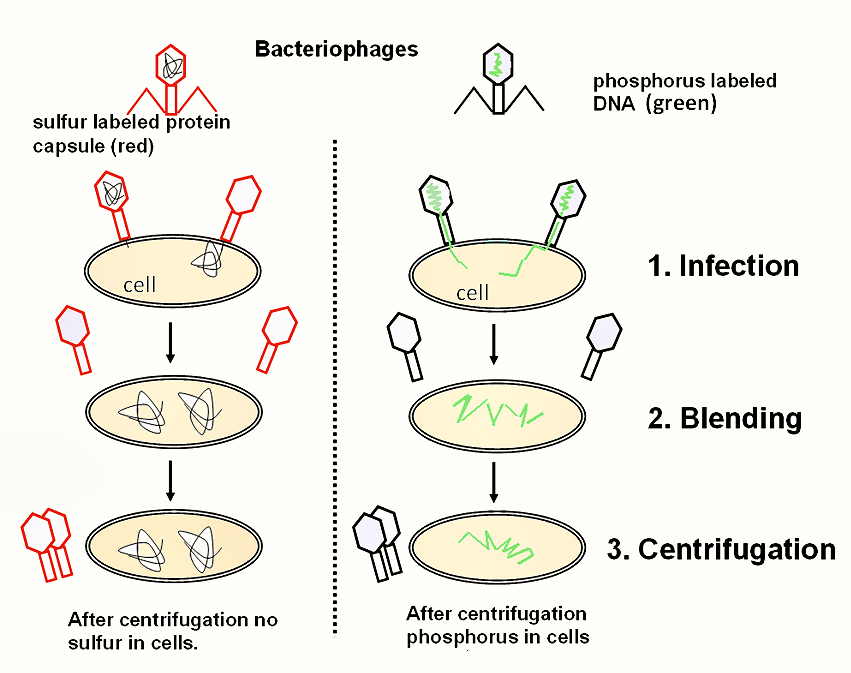
Overview of experiment and observations

The Hershey–Chase experiments, also called the Blender experiment, were a series of experiments conducted in 1952 by Alfred Hershey and Martha Chase that helped to confirm that DNA is genetic material.

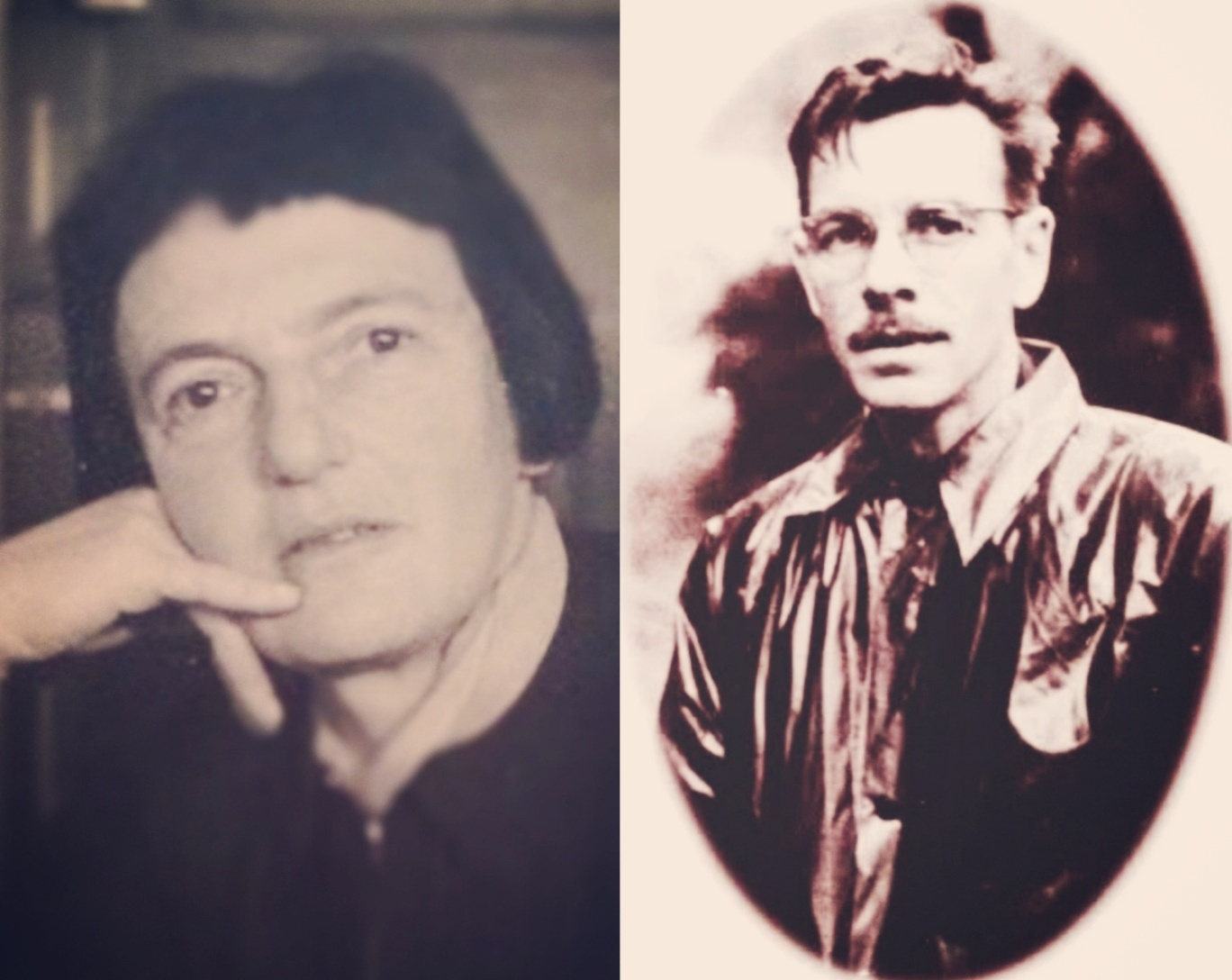
Scientists Martha Chase and Alfred Hershey

While DNA had been known to biologists since 1869, many scientists still assumed at the time that proteins carried the information for inheritance because DNA appeared to be an inert molecule, and, since it is located in the nucleus, its role was considered to be phosphorus storage. In their experiments, Hershey and Chase showed that when bacteriophages, which are composed of DNA and protein, infect bacteria, their DNA enters the host bacterial cell, but most of their protein does not. Hershey and Chase and subsequent discoveries all served to prove that DNA is the hereditary material.

Hershey shared the 1969 Nobel Prize in Physiology or Medicine with Max Delbrück and Salvador Luria for their "discoveries concerning the genetic structure of viruses".

== Historical background ==
In the early twentieth century, biologists thought that proteins carried genetic information. This was based on the belief that proteins were more complex than DNA. Phoebus Levene's influential "tetranucleotide hypothesis", which incorrectly proposed that DNA was a repeating set of identical nucleotides, supported this conclusion. The results of the Avery–MacLeod–McCarty experiment, published in 1944, suggested that DNA was the genetic material, but there was still some hesitation within the general scientific community to accept this, which set the stage for the Hershey–Chase experiment.

Hershey and Chase, along with others who had done related experiments, confirmed that DNA was the biomolecule that carried genetic information. Before that, Oswald Avery, Colin MacLeod, and Maclyn McCarty had shown that DNA led to the transformation of one strain of Streptococcus pneumoniae to another. The results of these experiments provided evidence that DNA was the biomolecule that carried genetic information.

== Methods and results ==
Structural overview of T2 phage

Hershey and Chase needed to be able to examine different parts of the phages they were studying separately, so they needed to distinguish the phage subsections. Viruses were known to be composed of a protein shell and DNA, so they chose to uniquely label each with a different elemental isotope. This allowed each to be observed and analyzed separately. Since phosphorus is contained in DNA but not amino acids, radioactive phosphorus-32 was used to label the DNA contained in the T2 phage. Radioactive sulfur-35 was used to label the protein sections of the T2 phage, because sulfur is contained in protein but not DNA.

Hershey and Chase inserted the radioactive elements in the bacteriophages by adding the isotopes to separate media within which bacteria were allowed to grow for 4 hours before bacteriophage introduction. When the bacteriophages infected the bacteria, the progeny contained the radioactive isotopes in their structures. This procedure was performed once for the sulfur-labeled phages and once for phosphorus-labeled phages. The labeled progeny were then allowed to infect unlabeled bacteria. The phage coats remained on the outside of the bacteria, while genetic material entered. Disruption of phage from the bacteria by agitation in a blender followed by centrifugation allowed for the separation of the phage coats from the bacteria. These bacteria were lysed to release phage progeny. The progeny of the phages that were labeled with radioactive phosphorus remained labeled, whereas the progeny of the phages labeled with radioactive sulfur were unlabeled. Thus, the Hershey–Chase experiment helped to confirm that DNA, not protein, is the genetic material.

Hershey and Chase showed that the introduction of deoxyribonuclease (referred to as DNase), an enzyme that breaks down DNA, into a solution containing the labeled bacteriophages did not introduce any ^{32}P into the solution. This demonstrated that the phage is resistant to the enzyme while intact. Additionally, they were able to plasmolyze the bacteriophages so that they went into osmotic shock, which effectively created a solution containing most of the ^{32}P and a heavier solution containing structures called "ghosts" that contained the ^{35}S and the protein coat of the virus. It was found that these "ghosts" could adsorb to bacteria that were susceptible to T2, although they contained no DNA and were simply the remains of the original viral capsule. They concluded that the protein protected the DNA from DNase, but that once the two were separated and the phage was inactivated, the DNase could hydrolyze the phage DNA.

=== Experiment and conclusions ===
Hershey and Chase were also able to prove that the DNA from the phage is inserted into the bacteria shortly after the virus attaches to its host. Using a high-speed blender they were able to force the bacteriophages from the bacterial cells after adsorption. The lack of ^{32}P-labeled DNA remaining in the solution after the bacteriophages had been allowed to adsorb to the bacteria showed that the phage DNA was transferred into the bacterial cell. The presence of almost all the radioactive ^{35}S in the solution showed that the protein coat that protects the DNA before adsorption stayed outside the cell.

Hershey and Chase concluded that DNA, not protein, was the genetic material. They determined that a protective protein coat was formed around the bacteriophage, but that the internal DNA is what conferred its ability to produce progeny inside a bacterium. They showed that, in growth, protein has no function, while DNA has some function. They determined this from the amount of radioactive material remaining outside of the cell. Only 20% of the ^{32}P remained outside the cell, demonstrating that it was incorporated with DNA in the cell's genetic material. All of the ^{35}S in the protein coats remained outside the cell, showing it was not incorporated into the cell, and that protein is not the genetic material.

Hershey and Chase's experiment concluded that little sulfur-containing material entered the bacterial cell. However no specific conclusions can be made regarding whether material that is sulfur-free enters the bacterial cell after phage adsorption. Further research was necessary to conclude that it was solely bacteriophages' DNA that entered the cell and not a combination of protein and DNA where the protein did not contain any sulfur.

== Discussion ==
=== Confirmation ===
Hershey and Chase concluded that protein was not likely to be the hereditary genetic material. However, they did not make any conclusions regarding the specific function of DNA as hereditary material, and only said that it must have some undefined role.

Confirmation and clarity came a year later in 1953, when James D. Watson and Francis Crick correctly hypothesized, in their journal article "Molecular Structure of Nucleic Acids: A Structure for Deoxyribose Nucleic Acid", the double helix structure of DNA, and suggested the copying mechanism by which DNA functions as hereditary material. Furthermore, Watson and Crick suggested that DNA, the genetic material, is responsible for the synthesis of the thousands of proteins found in cells. They had made this proposal based on the structural similarity that exists between the two macromolecules: both protein and DNA are linear sequences of monomers (amino acids and nucleotides, respectively).

=== Other experiments ===
Once the Hershey–Chase experiment was published, the scientific community generally acknowledged that DNA was the genetic code material. This discovery led to a more detailed investigation of DNA to determine its composition as well as its 3D structure. Using X-ray crystallography, the structure of DNA was discovered by James Watson and Francis Crick with the help of previously documented experimental evidence by Maurice Wilkins and Rosalind Franklin. Knowledge of the structure of DNA led scientists to examine the nature of genetic coding and, in turn, understand the process of protein synthesis. George Gamow proposed that the genetic code was composed of sequences of three DNA base pairs known as triplets or codons which represent one of the twenty amino acids. Genetic coding helped researchers to understand the mechanism of gene expression, the process by which information from a gene is used in protein synthesis. Since then, much research has been conducted to modulate steps in the gene expression process. These steps include transcription, RNA splicing, translation, and post-translational modification which are used to control the chemical and structural nature of proteins. Moreover, genetic engineering gives engineers the ability to directly manipulate the genetic materials of organisms using recombinant DNA techniques. The first recombinant DNA molecule was created by Paul Berg in 1972 when he combined DNA from the monkey virus SV40 with that of the lambda phage.

Experiments on hereditary material during the time of the Hershey–Chase experiment often used bacteriophages as a model organism. Bacteriophages lend themselves to experiments on hereditary material because they incorporate their genetic material into their host cell's genetic material (making them useful tools), they multiply quickly, and they are easily collected by researchers.

== Legacy ==
The Hershey–Chase experiment, its predecessors, such as the Avery–MacLeod–McCarty experiment, and successors served to unequivocally establish that hereditary information was carried by DNA. This finding has numerous applications in forensic science, crime investigation and genealogy. It provided the background knowledge for further applications in DNA forensics, where DNA fingerprinting uses data originating from DNA, not protein sources, to deduce genetic variation.
