= Fred Neufeld =

German physician

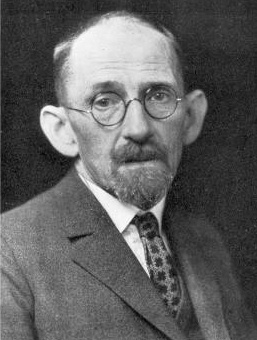
- Born: 17 February 1869; Danzig
- Died: 18 April 1945 (aged 76); Berlin, Germany
- Occupations: physician, bacteriologist
- Known for: discovery of pneumococcal types

Fred (Friedrich) Neufeld (17 February 1869 – 18 April 1945) was a physician and bacteriologist who discovered the pneumococcal types. This discovery led Fred Griffith to show that one pneumococcal type could be transformed into another (Griffith's experiment). Subsequently, Oswald Avery demonstrated that the transforming substance was DNA. All modern molecular biology has evolved from this work.

== Early years ==
Neufeld was the son of a physician. He was musically talented and a gifted pianist. In 1894, Neufeld became assistant to Robert Koch. He worked with Koch on studies of tuberculosis and went to Rhodesia with Koch in 1903 to study rinderpest.

== Neufeld's discoveries ==
In 1900 Neufeld discovered bile solubility of pneumococci. Addition of a small amount of ox bile to a pneumococcal culture results in complete destruction of the culture after a short incubation. This unique property became widely used to diagnose pneumococcal infections. Then, using immunological techniques, Neufeld discovered that there were three pneumococcal types. In the presence of type I antiserum type I pneumococci would swell, likewise types II and III in the presence of their specific antisera. Neufeld called this the quellung reaction, after the German word for swelling. The quellung reaction allowed for easy laboratory identification of pneumococcal types. Using Neufeld’s discoveries, Fred Griffith showed that pneumococci could transfer genetic information and transform one type into another. Oswald Avery then found that the transforming substance was DNA. All of modern molecular biology has evolved from this work.

== Later life ==
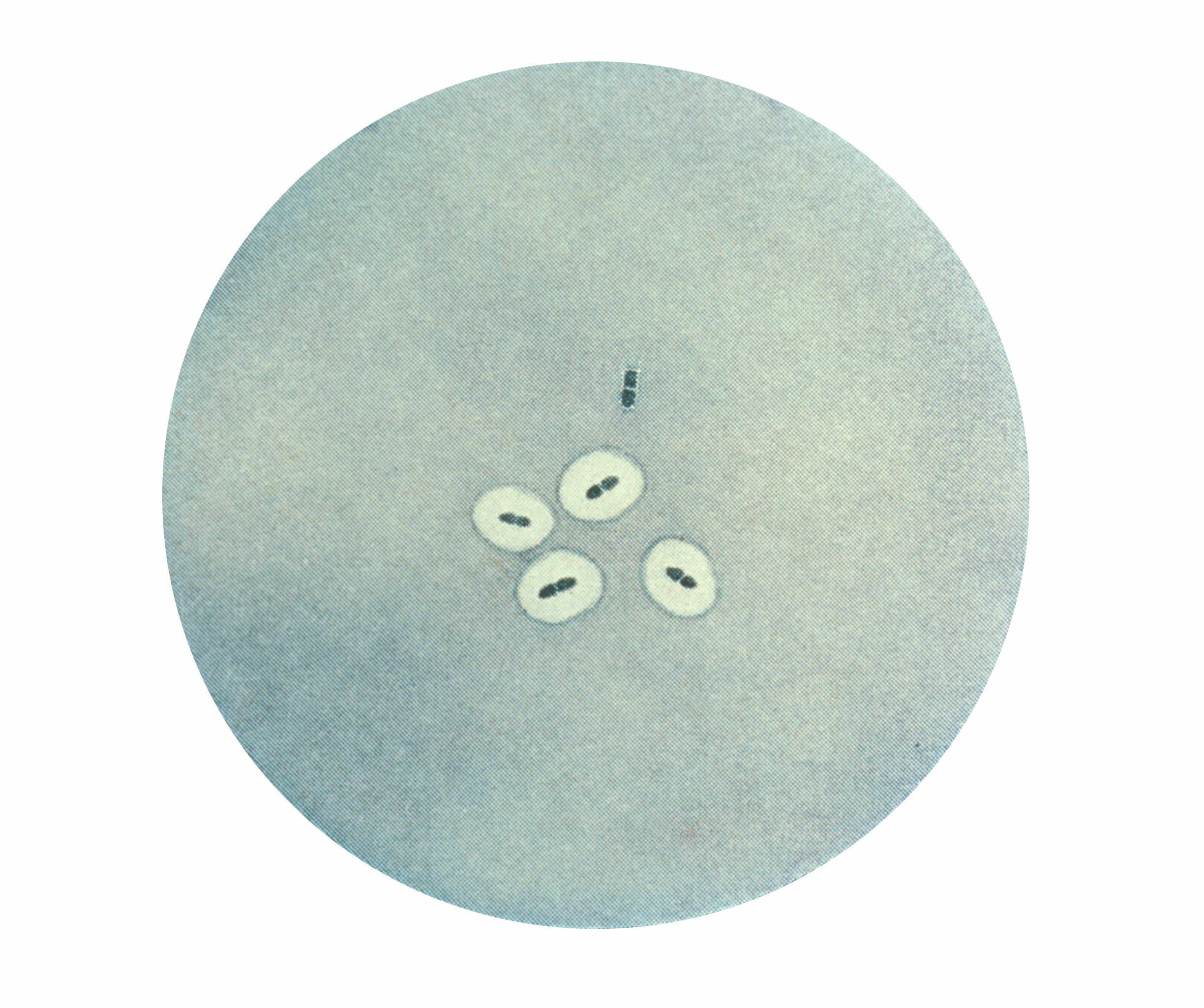
Photomicrograph of pneumococci revealing capsular swelling using the Neufeld quellung test.

From 1917 to 1933, Neufeld was director of the Robert Koch Institute in Berlin. He never married and lived with his mother until her death. When the Nazis came to power they immediately demoted Neufeld, although he was Protestant (Mennonite), not Jewish. Neufeld remained on the Institute staff as an "honorary member" (Ehrenmitglied) and continued to publish. In 1939 he was nominated for the Goethe-Medaille für Kunst und Wissenschaft for his scientific achievements, but did not receive the honour until Feb. 17, 1944, his 75th birthday. Neufeld died in war torn Berlin of “Entkräftung” (wasting).
