= Frederick Griffith =

British bacteriologist (1877–1941)

- Born: 1877; Prescot, England
- Died: 1941 (aged 63–64); London, England
- Education: Liverpool University
- Occupations: physician, pathologist, bacteriologist
- Known for: discovery of pneumococcal transformation
- Scientific career
- Workplaces: Ministry of Health Pathological Laboratory, Liverpool Royal Infirmary

Frederick Griffith (1877–1941) was a British bacteriologist whose focus was the epidemiology and pathology of bacterial pneumonia. In January 1928 he reported what is now known as Griffith's experiment, the first widely accepted demonstrations of bacterial transformation, whereby a bacterium distinctly changes its form and function.

He showed that Streptococcus pneumoniae, implicated in many cases of lobar pneumonia, could transform from one strain into a different strain. The observation was attributed to an unidentified underlying principle, later known in the Avery laboratory as the "transforming principle" (abbreviated as T. P.) and identified as DNA. America's leading pneumococcal researcher, Oswald T. Avery, speculated that Griffith had failed to apply adequate controls. A cautious and thorough researcher, and a reticent individual, Griffith's tendency was to publish only findings that he believed truly significant, and Griffith's findings were rapidly confirmed by researchers in Avery's laboratory. His discovery was one of the first to show the central role of DNA in heredity.

== Early life ==
Frederick Griffith was born in Prescot, Merseyside (formerly in Lancashire) England, in late 1877 (Registered December quarter in Prescot, Lancashire registration district, vol 8b, page 670), and attended Liverpool University. Thereafter, he worked at the Liverpool Royal Infirmary, the Joseph Tie Laboratory, and the Royal Commission on Tuberculosis. In 1910 Fred Griffith was hired by the local government board.

== Ministry of Health office ==
During World War I (1914–18), the local government board's laboratory was assumed by the national government, namely UK government, and became the Ministry of Health's Pathological Laboratory—where Griffith was medical officer. UK government spent money sparingly on the laboratory, which remained very basic, though Griffith and his colleague, William M. Scott, "could do more with a kerosene tin and a primus stove than most men could do with a palace".

Griffith was sent pneumococci samples taken from patients throughout the country, amassed a large number, and would type—in other words classify—each pneumococci sample to search patterns of pneumonia epidemiology, and Griffith experimented on mice for improved understanding of its pathology. Griffith performed the pivotal experiments—actually very many experiments—during the 1920s.

With outbreak of World War II (1939–45), the laboratory was expanded into the Emergency Public Health Laboratory Service.

== Griffith's experiment ==

Pneumococci has two general forms—rough (R) and smooth (S). The S form is more virulent, and bears a capsule, which is a slippery polysaccharide coat—outside the peptidoglycan cell wall common among all classical bacteria—and prevents efficient phagocytosis by the host's innate immune cells. Injected subcutaneously with S form, mice succumbed to pneumonia and death within several days. However, the R form, lacking a capsule—its outer surface being cell wall—is relatively avirulent, and does not cause pneumonia as often.

When Griffith injected heat-killed S into mice, as expected, no disease ensued. When mice were injected with a mixture of heat-killed S and live R, however, pneumonia and death ensued. The live R had transformed into S—and replicated as such—often characterized as Griffith's Experiment. More accurately, point six of Griffith's abstract reports that R tended to transform into S if a large amount of live R, alone, were injected, and that adding much heat-killed S made transformation reliable Griffith also induced some pneumococci to transform back and forth.

Griffith also reported transformation of serological type—bacterial antigenicity—distinct from presence or absence of a capsule. Bacteriologist Fred Neufeld, of the Robert Koch Institute in Berlin, Germany, had earlier identified the pneumococcal types, confirmed and expanded by Alphonse Dochez at Oswald Avery's laboratory in America at The Rockefeller Hospital. Types I, II, and III were each a distinct antigenic grouping, whereas type IV was a catchall of varying antigenicities not matching other types.

Illustrating the plasticity of Streptococcus pneumoniae, the abstract of Griffith's paper reports, "The S form of Type I has been produced from the R form of Type II, and the R form of Type I has been transformed into the S form of Type II".

== Impact of Griffith's discovery ==
=== Biomedical reception ===
One of America's most prominent pneumococcus experts, Oswald Avery, in New York at The Rockefeller Hospital—which opened in 1910 on The Rockefeller Institute's campus—initially explained that Griffith's experiments must have been poorly conducted and succumbed to contamination. Avery biographer and colleague at The Rockefeller Institute, microbiologist Rene Dubos, recruited by The Rockefeller Institute from France, later described Griffith's findings as "exploding a bombshell in the field of pneumococcal immunology".

Avery's associate Martin Dawson at The Rockefeller Hospital confirmed each of Griffith's reported findings. Even before Griffith's publication, Fred Neufeld had confirmed them as well, and was merely awaiting publication of Griffith's findings before publishing his confirmation. Over the following years, Avery's illness, Graves' disease, kept him much out of his laboratory as other researchers in it experimented to determine, largely by process of elimination, which constituent was the transforming factor.

Microbiologists endeavored during the 1930s to dispel the monomorphist tenet, prevailing as institutional dogma, largely prevailing into the 21st century.

== Posthumous identification of transforming factor ==
=== Last days of Griffith and colleague ===
The first Griffith Memorial Lecture indicates that Fred Griffith died on the night of 17 April 1941—though the fourth lecture indicates that he died in his apartment in February 1941—alongside friend and colleague William M. Scott amid an air raid during World War II's London Blitz. A few weeks earlier, Scott had become director of the laboratory, which, with the outbreak of war, had become Emergency Public Health Laboratory Service. Both dated 3 May 1941, his obituary in The Lancet mentioned the historical discovery briefly, and his obituary in British Medical Journal failed to mention it.

=== Avery et al then Watson & Crick ===
In 1944 identification of the transforming factor was published in the Journal of Experimental Medicine by Avery, Colin MacLeod, and Maclyn McCarty of The Rockefeller Hospital. This identification departed from the prevailing belief that the protein content of chromosomes probably was the anatomical structure of genes, although it would take another decade—till Watson and Crick's 1953 paper in Nature indicating DNA's molecular structure suggesting how a molecule as seemingly simple as DNA could encode the structure of proteins—for the interpretation of DNA as genes to become widely accepted.

=== Applications ===
Biologists made little more than speculation of Griffith's report of transformation until genetics research in 1951. Griffith's report was virtually ignored by clinicians, and by the medical sector as a whole.

== Griffith's further work and legacy ==
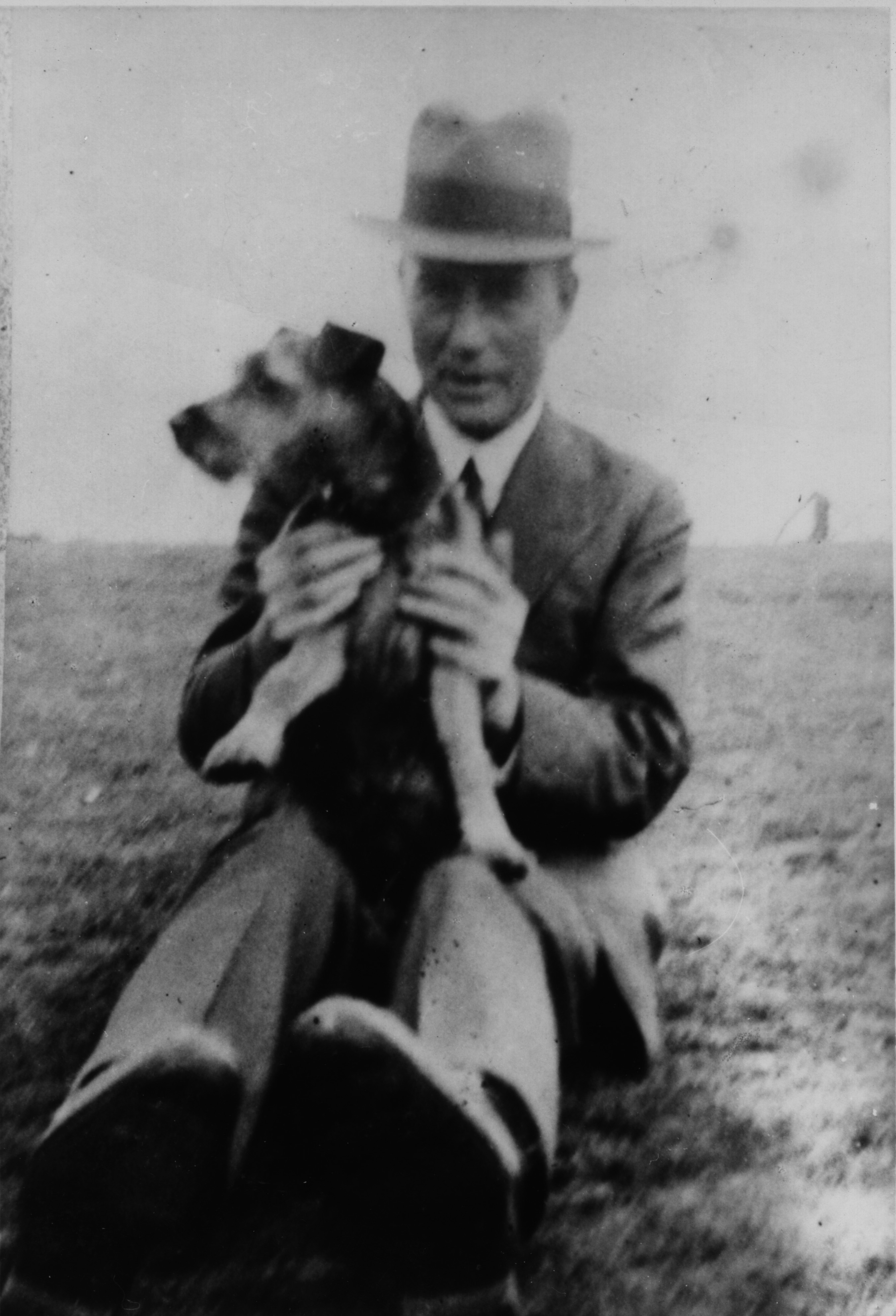
Fred Griffith in 1936

=== Bacteriology ===
In 1931 Frederick Griffith coauthored a paper on acute tonsillitis—its sequelae, epidemiology, and bacteriology. In 1934, Griffith reported voluminous findings on the serological typing of Streptococcus pyogenes. More casually as well as medically called simply streptococcus, S pyogenes is implicated in conditions ranging from the usually minor strep throat, to the sometimes fatal scarlet fever, to the often fatal puerperal fever, to the usually fatal streptococcal sepsis. Streptococcal infection was a frequent coinfection complicating recovery from lobar pneumonia by pneumococci infection.

=== Medicine ===
By 1967 pneumococcal transformation had been shown to occur in vivo naturally, and it was further shown that treatment with streptomycin during dual infection by two pneumococcal strains could increase transformation—and virulence—while for the first time pneumococcal transformation was shown to occur in the respiratory tract. In 1969 it was shown in vivo that during drug treatment of a host, pneumococci could acquire genes from antibiotic-resistant streptococci, already in the host, and thereby the pneumococci could become resistant to erythromycin.
