= Oswald Avery =

Canadian-American physician

Oswald Avery Jr. FRS
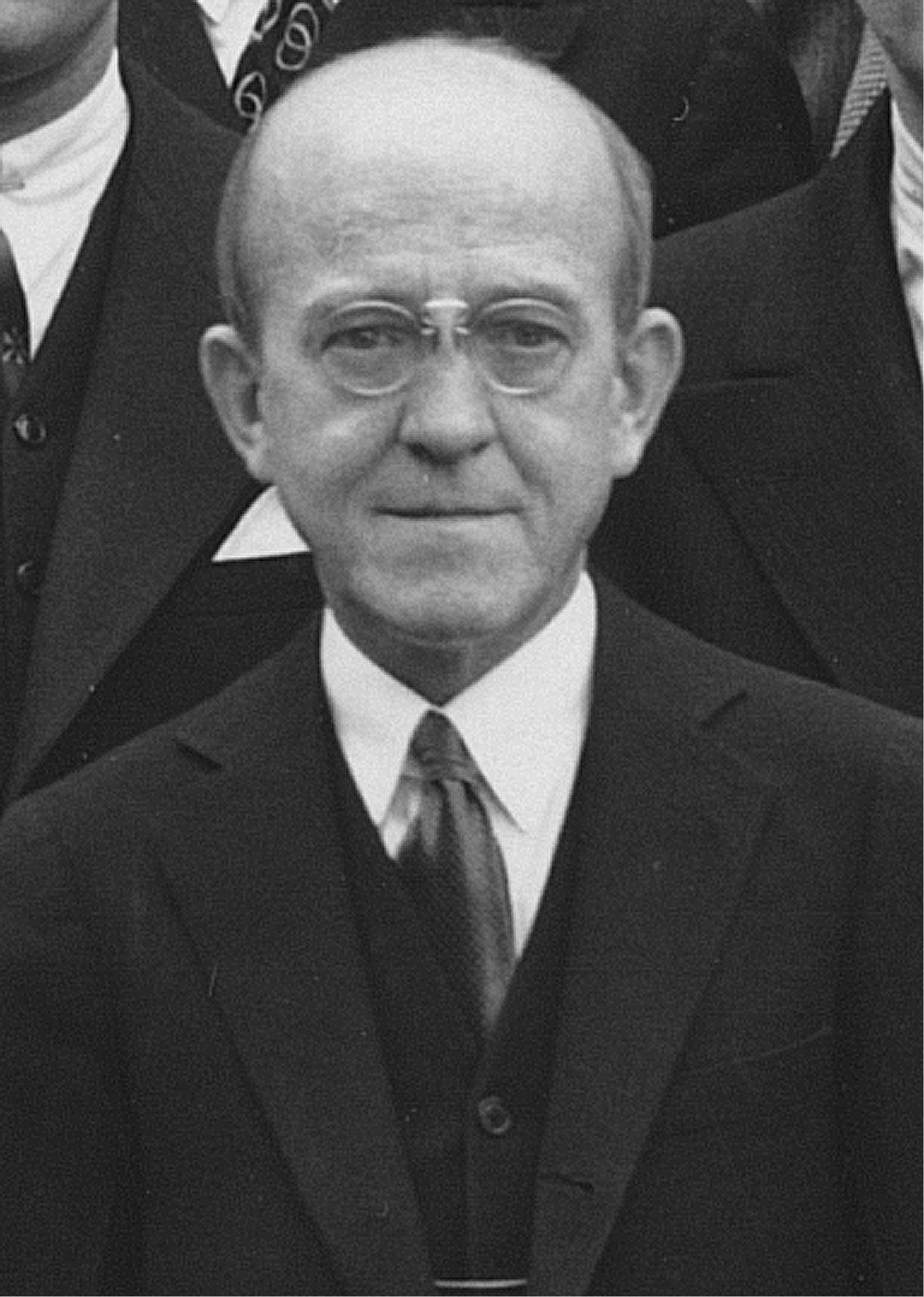
- Oswald Avery Jr. in 1937
- Born: October 21, 1877; Halifax, Nova Scotia, Canada
- Died: February 20, 1955 (aged 77); Nashville, Tennessee, U.S.
- Education: Colgate University (undergraduate) Columbia University (doctoral)
- Known for: Avery–MacLeod–McCarty experiment; DNA transmits heredity
- Awards: Copley Medal (1945); Albert Lasker Award for Basic Medical Research (1947)
- Scientific career
- Fields: Molecular biology
- Workplaces: Rockefeller University Hospital

Oswald Theodore Avery Jr. (October 21, 1877 – February 20, 1955) was a Canadian-American physician and medical researcher. The major part of his career was spent at the Rockefeller Hospital in New York City. Avery was one of the first molecular biologists and a pioneer in immunochemistry, but he is best known for the experiment (published in 1944 with his co-workers Colin MacLeod and Maclyn McCarty) that isolated DNA as the material of which genes and chromosomes are made.

The Nobel laureate Arne Tiselius said that Avery was the most deserving scientist not to receive the Nobel Prize for his work, though he was nominated for the award throughout the 1930s, 1940s, and 1950s.

The lunar crater Avery was named in his honor.

== Family ==
Oswald Avery's grandfather was Joseph Henry Avery. He was a papermaker, and he was in charge of the papermaking at Oxford University. He discovered a way to make thin paper that could be printed on both sides. This paper was used to make Oxford Bibles.

Avery's father, Joseph Francis Avery, born in 1846 in Norwich, Norfolk, became a Baptist minister after coming under the influence of C. H. Spurgeon, a Baptist Evangelist. He married his wife, Elizabeth Crowdy, in 1870, and spent three years in England, where he would continue his pastoral service as a Baptist. After this, he would move to Halifax, Nova Scotia with his wife, against the wishes of his friends, believing it to be the Will of God. He remained as a pastor for 14 years in Halifax before traveling to the Mariners' Temple in New York City, where he would preach to a rowdy and poverty-stricken crowd. While here, he would publish an edifying pamphlet entitled "The Voyage of Life", edited the church publication Buds and Blossoms, and patented and attempted to sell a preparation known as "Avery's Auraline", though it would gain little success. When their home burned to the ground in December 1890, the Baptist community of New York banded together to help pay for the expenses, including one John D. Rockefeller. He would die in 1892, leaving his wife Elizabeth Avery a widow.

After Joseph Francis Avery's death, Elizabeth continued editing the publication Buds and Blossoms. She would also continue to work with the Baptist City Mission Society, where she would come into association with a number of wealthy people, including the Sloans, the Vanderbilts, and the Rockefellers.

Oswald had two siblings - an older brother Ernest and a younger brother Roy. Ernest was a gifted child, but became ill at a young age. Roy followed his brother Oswald in the field of bacteriology. He eventually taught at Vanderbilt Medical School in Nashville, Tennessee.

== Early life and education ==
Oswald Avery was born in Halifax, Nova Scotia, in 1877 to Francis Joseph Avery, a Baptist minister, and his wife Elizabeth Crowdy. The couple had emigrated from Britain in 1873. Oswald Avery was born and grew up in a small wooden row house on Moran Street in the North End of Halifax, now a designated heritage building. When Avery was 10, his family moved to the Lower East Side of New York City. Oswald Avery began participating in church activities at a young age. He and his older brother Ernest learned how to play the cornet from a German musician who played at church. Soon, both were playing at church themselves. The brothers played on the steps of Mariners' Temple to attract worshippers. Both earned a scholarship to the National Conservatory of Music. Ernest became sick and did not continue, but Oswald pushed onward. He became talented enough to play with the National Academy of Music in Antonín Dvořák's Symphony No. 5, From the New World, under direction of Walter Damrosch.

Oswald Avery began at Colgate University in 1896. Even though Colgate was a Baptist school, there were signs of rebellion against orthodoxy during Avery's time at the university. In Avery's senior year, he and a few of his classmates asked their philosophy professor to create a metaphysics class that would allow them to explore the credibility of the Christian faith. Avery's senior year was entirely electives, but he did not choose to take a single science elective, even though many were offered. Avery made exceptional grades throughout his years at Colgate. He received 8.5 out of 10 or above in all courses his freshman year and 9 out of 10 or above his sophomore through senior year. Avery's top grades were in his public speaking courses, in which he never received lower than a 9.5. He even tied for first with his friend Emerson in an oratorical contest. Avery earned his undergraduate degree in humanities at Colgate University and was a member of the Class of 1900.

Oswald Avery began medical studies at The College of Physicians and Surgeons at Columbia University in New York later in the year of 1900. At the college, he made good grades in all of his courses, except bacteriology and pathology. He graduated with a medical degree in 1904, and then he began to practice general medicine. Avery did not like dealing with patients who had chronic diseases that he was unable to fix. He practiced medicine until 1907 when he began working as an associate director to Benjamin White in Hoagland Laboratory.

== Hoagland Laboratory ==
At Hoagland Laboratory, he began by studying the bacteriology of yogurt and other fermented milk products and their effects on gut bacteria. He recorded his findings in "Observations on Certain Lactic Acid Bacteria of the Bulgaricus Type". During the years 1909 through 1913, he performed medical research with immunological and chemical approaches.

For a period of time, White came down with tuberculosis. Avery went with him to Trudea Sanatorium for a cure. Afterwards, Avery went back to take vacations at the sanatorium. He became interested in tuberculosis and began doing research in the Trudea Laboratory, where he looked at the clinical and experimental aspects of tuberculosis. Here he carried out 100 consecutive blood cultures of tuberculosis patients in the active phase of the disease. He never found evidence of secondary infection. His careful clinical investigation caught the eye of Dr. Rufus Cole at Rockefeller Institute.

At Hoagland, Avery performed a chemical and toxicological study of a product derived from tubercle bacilli. With White as a colleague, he extracted the product with alkaline ethanol. The research was published in 1912. This further showed his systematic effort to observe and analyze bacterial activity using their chemical structure. In 1911, Avery instructed staff of H. K. Mulford Company in bacteriological techniques, and they taught him the industrial methods for production of antitoxins and vaccines.

Throughout his time at Hoagland, Avery published nine papers, one of which was a chapter on "Opsonins and Vaccine Therapy". He collaborated with Dr. N. B. Potter for this chapter, which was put in Hare's Modern Treatment - a popular medical magazine at the time. Avery also taught a course to student nurses at Hoagland. During the course, he conveyed the dangers of pathogens spread through sneezing. During his teaching, he was given the nicknames "The Professor" and "Fess". While working at Hoagland, Avery was mailed two written offers from Rockefeller Institute, and he denied them both. Avery did not accept the offer until Rufus Cole from Rockefeller came to offer the position to him in person.

== Rockefeller Institute ==
Oswald Avery entered Rockefeller Institute as Assistant in 1913, and in 1915, he became an Associate. In 1919, Avery was promoted to an associate member. He was granted full membership in 1923. At the institute, Cole, Avery and Alphonse Dochez developed the first effective immune serum against a strain of pneumococcus, a bacterium causing pneumonia. The serum was produced from the blood of infected horses.

Research showed that various pneumonia cultures isolated from different patients had different immunological properties. This made it difficult to develop a serum effective against all of the different strains. Four main groups of pneumococcus had been discovered - type I, type II, type III, and type IV. Avery investigated distribution of different pneumococcus types in healthy individuals versus individuals with symptoms of pneumonia. Avery found different subgroups of type II pneumococcus. These groups were similar to the type strain in certain aspects. However, the subgroups of type II had similarities amongst each other that they did not share with the other main groups of pneumococcus. Avery wrote about the results of his findings in a 1915 paper called "Varieties of Pneumococcus and Their Relation to Lobar Pneumonia". In the paper, he argued that people who appeared to be healthy could be carriers of pneumonia Avery also suggested it was important to identify the type of strain, based on agglutination of the pneumococci, when determining the appropriate serum for the patient. Avery suggested pneumococci strains that produced more severe symptoms had higher virulence than strains that cause less severe symptoms. A serum effective against type II pneumonia was developed. Avery tested the serum in horses. He processed the serum and measured its antipneumococcal activity. Avery concentrated the serum so that a minimal amount of foreign protein was needed in it. Avery wrote the monograph, Acute Lobar Pneumonia: Prevention and Serum Treatment, that was published by The Institute explaining this improvement.

Avery also helped Dochez in his research on specific soluble substances found in the blood and urine of pneumonia patients. The presence of specific soluble substances in a urine sample allowed him to rapidly test the type of pneumonia without having to wait for a culture to grow. Avery and Heidelberger realized that the capsules of different strains of pneumonia had different polysaccharide structures and concluded that polysaccharides play a role in immunological specificity. Their work with specific soluble substances showed that it is important to consider the factor in the chemical composition of organisms to design anti-serums. Avery published papers on specific soluble substance findings between 1923 and 1929, along with an additional paper he published with Goebel in 1933. He worked with Goebel until 1934, and then Gobel continued their work upon his cessation. Later, Avery concluded that a protein determines the specificity of Diplococcus pneumoniae after he observed that the active protein was the same for all pneumococcal strains but different than that of other bacteria.

Avery became an emeritus member of The Institute when he retired in 1943. However, he continued to work in the lab until 1948.

== Debate over the pathogen in the 1918 influenza epidemic ==
At the height of the 1918 influenza epidemic, the dominant hypothesis was that the causative agent in the disease was a bacterium — specifically, Haemophilus influenzae (then called 'Pfeiffer's bacillus' or Bacillus influenzae), a microbe first isolated by German bacteriologist Richard Pfeiffer, which he had identified in nasal samples of patients infected by seasonal influenza decades earlier and which was also found in many but not all samples taken from patients in the 1918 epidemic. The failure to isolate B. influenzae in some patients was generally attributed to the difficulty of culturing the bacterium.

Peter Olitsky and Frederick Gates at the Rockefeller Institute found that nasal secretions from infected patients could still cause disease in the lungs of rabbits after having been filtered through a bacterium-excluding Berkefeld filter, but other researchers were unable to reproduce their results. Avery initially doubted Olitsky's and Gates's data, and set out to prove the B. influenzae hypothesis. For that purpose, he developed improved culture media for B. influenzae, which were widely adopted and reduced the possibility of false negatives. However, B. influenzae could still not be found in all influenza patients. The true cause of influenza, a virus, would not be discovered until the 1930s.

== DNA as the basis for genes ==
After the influenza epidemic, Avery returned to his work on pneumococcus. He identified R and S strains of the bacterium; the latter caused disease and had a polysaccharide capsule, while the former lacked the capsule and was harmless. Griffith's experiment of 1928 showed that the ability to produce a capsule could be transferred from S to R strain bacteria, even if the S strain bacteria were killed first.

For many years, genetic information was thought to be contained in cell protein. Continuing the research done by Frederick Griffith, Avery worked with Colin MacLeod and Maclyn McCarty on the mystery of inheritance. He had received emeritus status from the Rockefeller Institute in 1943, but continued working for five years, though by that time he was in his late sixties. In 1944 at the Rockefeller Institute's Hospital for medical research, Oswald Avery, along with Colin MacLeod and Maclyn McCarty, isolated S-strain bacteria and killed them with heat. They used available techniques to remove various macromolecules - proteins, RNA, and DNA - from the bacteria. Then, the killed S-strain bacteria, with various substances removed, were placed with live R-strain bacteria. Avery hypothesized that if the live R-strain bacteria did not transform into S-strain bacteria, then the missing substance contained genetic information and was the "transforming principle". Proteins were removed with protease enzymes and upon transfer of S-strain bacteria into R-strain, the R-strain transformed into S-strain. Therefore, proteins were not the "transforming principle". Next, the S-strain bacteria were treated with ribonucleases to degrade their RNA, and the remainder of the S-strain was placed with the live R-strain bacteria. The R-strain still transformed into S-strain, suggesting that RNA was not the transforming substance. Finally, the S-strain bacteria were treated with a deoxyribonuclease enzymes, which removed the DNA, and the S-strain bacteria were placed with the live R-strain bacteria. After this treatment, the R-strain bacteria did not transform into S-strain bacteria. The lack of transformation suggested that DNA was the substance that transformed R-strain into S-strain bacteria and indicated that it was the carrier of genetic information in cells.

Avery's conclusion, that "The evidence presented supports the belief that a nucleic acid of the desoxyribose type is the fundamental unit of the transforming principle of Pneumococcus Type III" greatly influenced Erwin Chargaff, who upon reading those words dedicated his work to identify a "chemistry of heredity" which he later elucidated in Chargaff's rules. Chargaff would later comment that "As this transformation represents a permanently inheritable alteration of a cell, the chemical nature of the substance responsible for this alteration had been elucidated for the first time. Seldom has more been said in so few words."

Alfred Hershey and Martha Chase furthered Avery's research in 1952 with the Hershey–Chase experiment. These experiments paved the way for Watson and Crick's discovery of the helical structure of DNA, and thus the birth of modern genetics and molecular biology. Of this event, Avery wrote in a letter to his youngest brother Roy, a bacteriologist at the Vanderbilt School of Medicine: "It's lots of fun to blow bubbles but it's wiser to prick them yourself before someone else tries to."

Nobel laureate Joshua Lederberg stated that Avery and his laboratory provided "the historical platform of modern DNA research" and "betokened the molecular revolution in genetics and biomedical science generally".

== Retirement and later years ==
While working at Rockefeller Institute, Avery contracted Grave's disease, which caused him to experienced mood swings of depression and irritability. After undergoing a thyroidectomy, Avery once again became more lively and began sailing, where he fell in love with the sport. Shortly after, he retired in Nashville, Tennessee, where he lived close to his brother and his brother's family, where he was regarded not as a scientist, but as a pleasant family man and a kind country gentleman. While in the southern United States, Avery took a particular interest in the local flora and would act as a gardener would, learning about and appreciating the flowers and trees.

Avery's enthusiasm toward researching nucleic acids continued into his retirement, and he would continue his work with Dr. Hugh Morgan, chairman of the department of medicine at Vanderbilt Medical School. Dr. Morgan was given a research grant from the Department of Defense to study immunity to streptococcal infection, and he convinced Avery to help him in his research. Avery worked on this research with Dr. Bertram E. Sprofkin. The two wrote a joint report on "Studies on the bacteriolytic property of Streptomyces albus and its action on hemolytic streptococci".

During his later years, Avery became terminally ill with extensive hepatoma, or liver cancer. He died at age 77 on February 20, 1955, and was buried in Mount Olivet cemetery in Nashville.

== Bibliography ==
The collected papers of Avery are stored at the Tennessee State Library and Archives. Many of his papers, poems, and hand written lab-notes are available at the National Library of Medicine in the Oswald T. Avery Collection, the first of their Profiles in Science series.
