= Avery–MacLeod–McCarty experiment =

1944 microbiology experiment

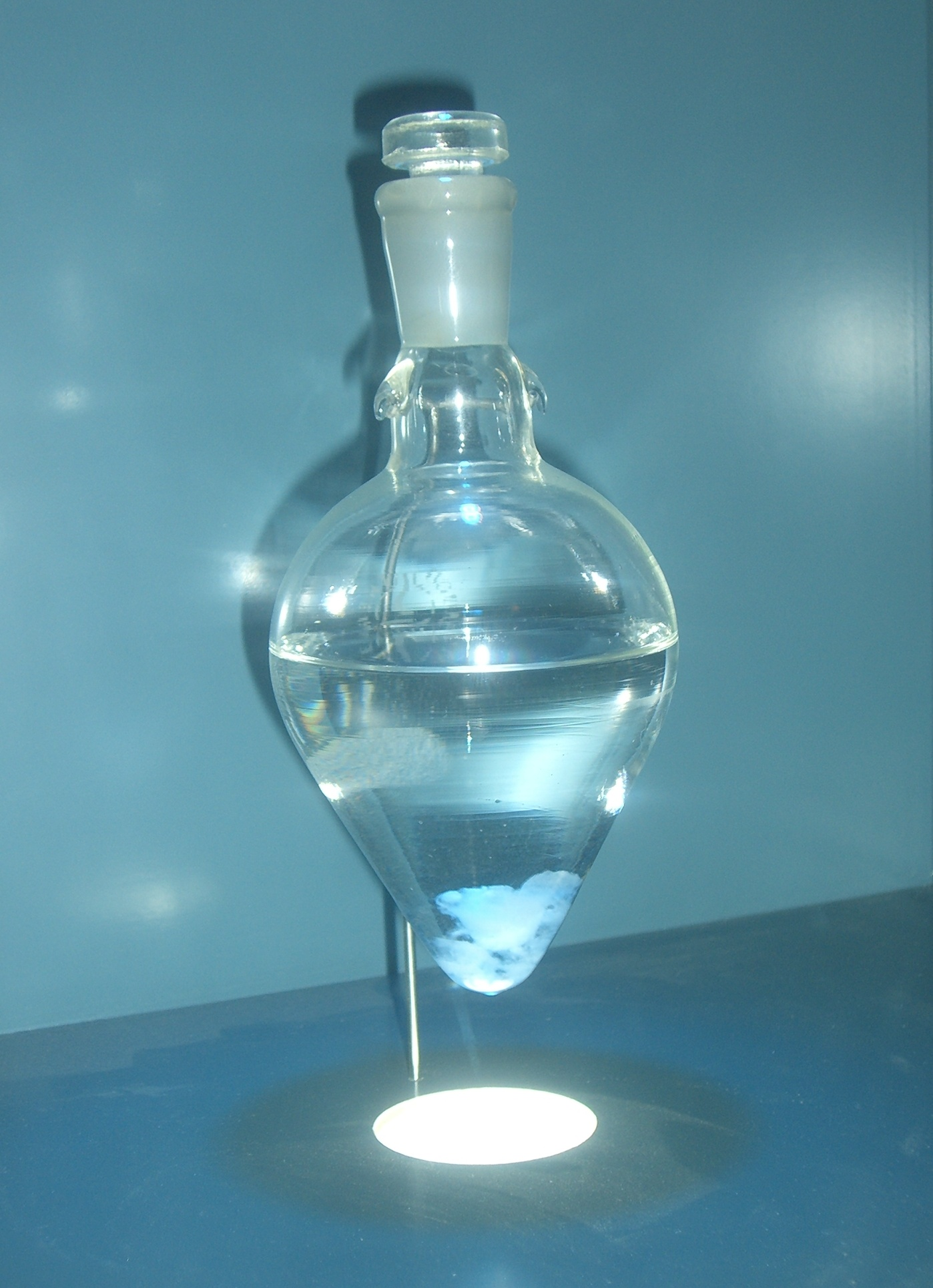
Hyder, Avery, MacLeod and McCarty used strands of purified DNA such as this, precipitated from solutions of cell components, to perform bacterial transformations

The Avery–MacLeod–McCarty experiment was an experimental demonstration by Oswald Avery, Colin MacLeod, and Maclyn McCarty that, in 1944, reported that DNA is the substance that causes bacterial transformation, in an era when it had been widely believed that it was proteins that served the function of carrying genetic information (with the very word protein itself coined to indicate a belief that its function was primary). It was the culmination of research in the 1930s and early 20th century at the Rockefeller Institute for Medical Research to purify and characterize the "transforming principle" responsible for the transformation phenomenon first described in Griffith's experiment of 1928: killed Streptococcus pneumoniae of the virulent strain type III-S, when injected along with living but non-virulent type II-R pneumococci, resulted in a deadly infection of type III-S pneumococci. In their paper "Studies on the Chemical Nature of the Substance Inducing Transformation of Pneumococcal Types: Induction of Transformation by a Desoxyribonucleic Acid Fraction Isolated from Pneumococcus Type III", published in the February 1944 issue of the Journal of Experimental Medicine, Avery and his colleagues suggest that DNA, rather than protein as widely believed at the time, may be the hereditary material of bacteria, and could be analogous to genes and/or viruses in higher organisms.

Avery and his colleagues showed that DNA was the key component of Griffith's experiment, in which mice are injected with dead bacteria of one strain and live bacteria of another, and develop an infection of the dead strain's type.

== Background ==
With the development of serological typing, medical researchers were able to sort bacteria into different strains, or types. When a person or test animal (e.g., a mouse) is inoculated with a particular type, an immune response ensues, generating antibodies that react specifically with antigens on the bacteria. Blood serum containing the antibodies can then be extracted and applied to cultured bacteria. The antibodies will react with other bacteria of the same type as the original inoculation. Fred Neufeld, a German bacteriologist, had discovered the pneumococcal types and serological typing; until Frederick Griffith's studies bacteriologists believed that the types were fixed and unchangeable from one generation to the next.

Griffith's experiment, reported in 1928, identified that some "transforming principle" in pneumococcal bacteria could transform them from one type to another. Griffith, a British medical officer, had spent years applying serological typing to cases of pneumonia, a frequently fatal disease in the early 20th century. He found that multiple types—some virulent and some non-virulent—were often present over the course of a clinical case of pneumonia, and thought that one type might change into another (rather than simply multiple types being present all along). In testing that possibility, he found that transformation could occur when dead bacteria of a virulent type and live bacteria of a non-virulent type were both injected in mice: the mice would develop a fatal infection (normally only caused by live bacteria of the virulent type) and die, and virulent bacteria could be isolated from such infected mice.

The findings of Griffith's experiment were soon confirmed, first by Fred Neufeld at the Koch Institute and by Martin Henry Dawson at the Rockefeller Institute. A series of Rockefeller Institute researchers continued to study transformation in the years that followed. With Richard H. P. Sia, Dawson developed a method of transforming bacteria in vitro (rather than in vivo as Griffith had done). After Dawson's departure in 1930, James Alloway took up the attempt to extend Griffith's findings, resulting in the extraction of aqueous solutions of the transforming principle by 1933. Colin MacLeod worked to purify such solutions from 1934 to 1937, and the work was continued in 1940 and completed by Maclyn McCarty.

== Experimental work ==
Pneumococcus is characterized by smooth colonies which have a polysaccharide capsule that induces antibody formation; the different types are classified according to their immunological specificity.

The purification procedure Avery undertook consisted of first killing the bacteria with heat and extracting the saline-soluble components. Next, the protein was precipitated out using chloroform and the polysaccharide capsules were hydrolyzed with an enzyme. An immunological precipitation caused by type-specific antibodies was used to verify the complete destruction of the capsules. Then, the active portion was precipitated out by alcohol fractionation, resulting in fibrous strands that could be removed with a stirring rod.

Chemical analysis showed that the proportions of carbon, hydrogen, nitrogen, and phosphorus in this active portion were consistent with the chemical composition of DNA. To show that it was DNA rather than some small amount of RNA, protein, or some other cell component that was responsible for transformation, Avery and his colleagues used a number of biochemical tests. They found that trypsin, chymotrypsin and ribonuclease (enzymes that break apart proteins or RNA) did not affect it, but an enzyme preparation of "deoxyribonucleodepolymerase" (a crude preparation, obtainable from a number of animal sources, that could break down DNA) destroyed the extract's transforming power.

Follow-up work in response to criticism and challenges included the purification and crystallization, by Moses Kunitz in 1948, of a DNA depolymerase (deoxyribonuclease I), and precise work by Rollin Hotchkiss showing that virtually all the detected nitrogen in the purified DNA came from glycine, a breakdown product of the nucleotide base adenine, and that undetected protein contamination was at most 0.02% by Hotchkiss's estimation.

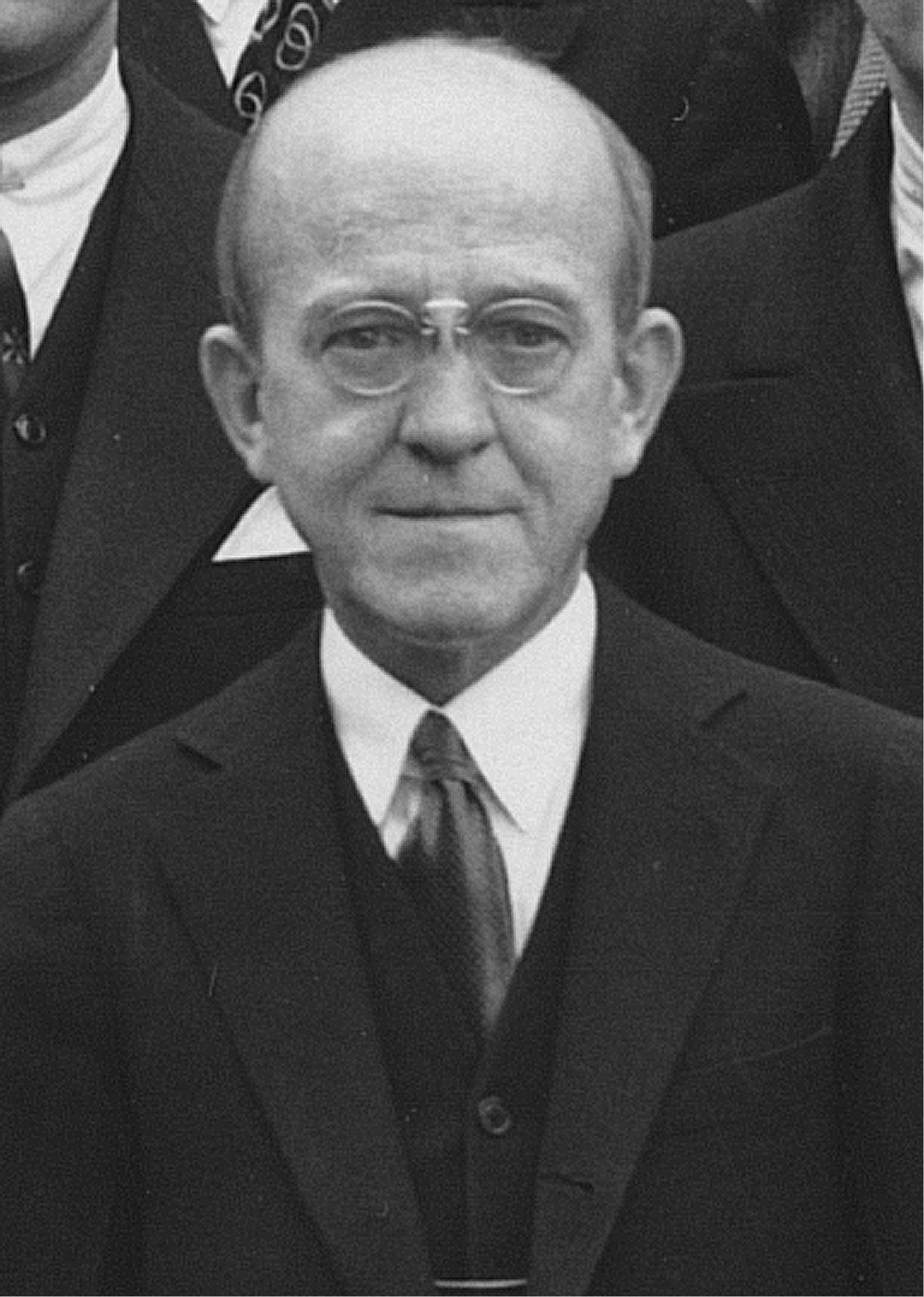
Oswald Avery

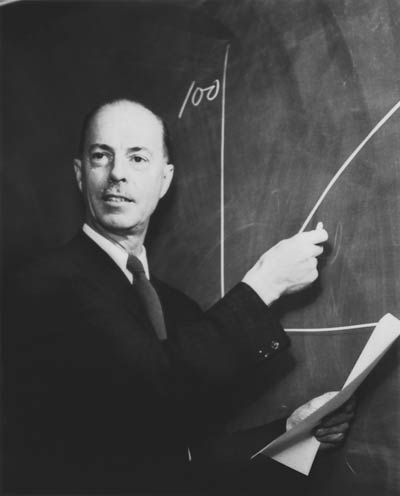
Colin MacLeod

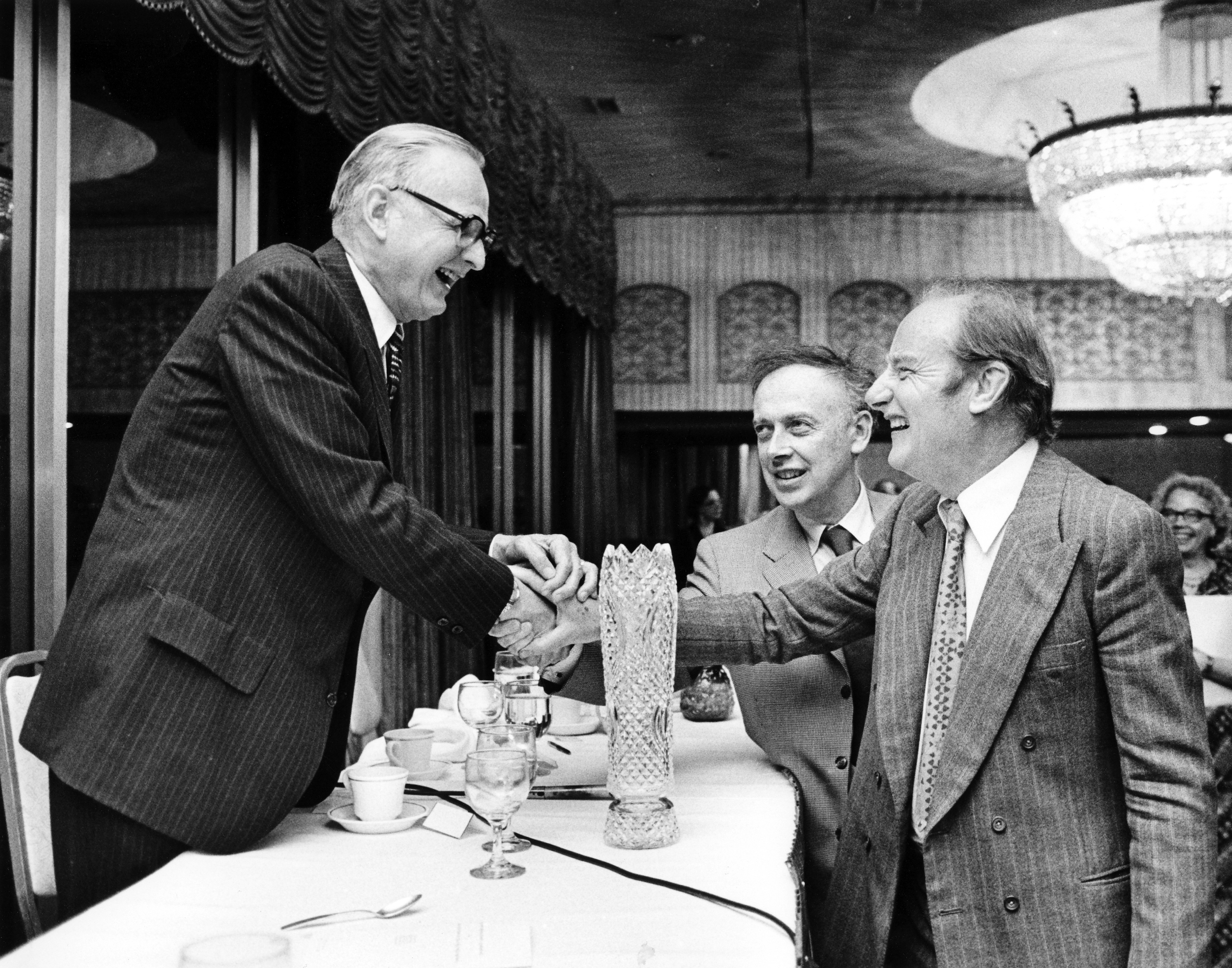
Maclyn McCarty (with Watson and Crick)

== Reception and legacy ==
The experimental findings of the Avery–MacLeod–McCarty experiment were quickly confirmed, and extended to other hereditary characteristics besides polysaccharide capsules. However, there was considerable reluctance to accept the conclusion that DNA was the genetic material. According to Phoebus Levene's influential "tetranucleotide hypothesis", DNA consisted of repeating units of the four nucleotide bases and had little biological specificity. DNA was therefore thought to be the structural component of chromosomes, whereas the genes were thought likely to be made of the protein component of chromosomes. This line of thinking was reinforced by the 1935 crystallization of tobacco mosaic virus by Wendell Stanley, and the parallels among viruses, genes, and enzymes; many biologists thought genes might be a sort of "super-enzyme", and viruses were shown according to Stanley to be proteins and to share the property of autocatalysis with many enzymes. Furthermore, few biologists thought that genetics could be applied to bacteria, since they lacked chromosomes and sexual reproduction. In particular, many of the geneticists known informally as the phage group, which would become influential in the new discipline of molecular biology in the 1950s, were dismissive of DNA as the genetic material (and were inclined to avoid the "messy" biochemical approaches of Avery and his colleagues). Some biologists, including fellow Rockefeller Institute Fellow Alfred Mirsky, challenged Avery's finding that the transforming principle was pure DNA, suggesting that protein contaminants were instead responsible. Although transformation occurred in some kinds of bacteria, it could not be replicated in other bacteria (nor in any higher organisms), and its significance seemed limited primarily to medicine.

Scientists looking back on the Avery–MacLeod–McCarty experiment have disagreed about just how influential it was in the 1940s and early 1950s. Gunther Stent suggested that it was largely ignored, and only celebrated afterwards—similarly to Gregor Mendel's work decades before the rise of genetics. Others, such as Joshua Lederberg and Leslie C. Dunn, attest to its early significance and cite the experiment as the beginning of molecular genetics.

A few microbiologists and geneticists had taken an interest in the physical and chemical nature of genes before 1944, but the Avery–MacLeod–McCarty experiment brought renewed and wider interest in the subject. While the original publication did not mention genetics specifically, Avery as well as many of the geneticists who read the paper were aware of the genetic implications—that Avery may have isolated the gene itself as pure DNA. Biochemist Erwin Chargaff, geneticist H. J. Muller and others praised the result as establishing the biological specificity of DNA and as having important implications for genetics if DNA played a similar role in higher organisms. In 1945, the Royal Society awarded Avery the Copley Medal, in part for his work on bacterial transformation.

Between 1944 and 1954, the paper was cited at least 239 times (with citations spread evenly through those years), mostly in papers on microbiology, immunochemistry, and biochemistry. In addition to the follow-up work by McCarty and others at the Rockefeller Institute in response to Mirsky's criticisms, the experiment spurred considerable work in microbiology, where it shed new light on the analogies between bacterial heredity and the genetics of sexually-reproducing organisms. French microbiologist André Boivin claimed to extend Avery's bacterial transformation findings to Escherichia coli, although this could not be confirmed by other researchers. In 1946, however, Joshua Lederberg and Edward Tatum demonstrated bacterial conjugation in E. coli and showed that genetics could apply to bacteria, even if Avery's specific method of transformation was not general. Avery's work also motivated Maurice Wilkins to continue X-ray crystallographic studies of DNA, even as he faced pressure from funders to focus his research on whole cells, rather than biomolecules.

Despite the significant number of citations to the paper and positive responses it received in the years following publication, Avery's work was largely neglected by much of the scientific community. Although received positively by many scientists, the experiment did not seriously affect mainstream genetics research, in part because it made little difference for classical genetics experiments in which genes were defined by their behavior in breeding experiments rather than their chemical makeup. H. J. Muller, while interested, was focused more on physical rather than chemical studies of the gene, as were most of the members of the phage group. Avery's work was also neglected by the Nobel Foundation, which later expressed public regret for failing to award Avery a Nobel Prize.

By the time of the 1952 Hershey–Chase experiment, geneticists were more inclined to consider DNA as the genetic material, and Alfred Hershey was an influential member of the phage group. Erwin Chargaff had shown that the base composition of DNA varies by species (contrary to the tetranucleotide hypothesis), and in 1952 Rollin Hotchkiss published his experimental evidence both confirming Chargaff's work and demonstrating the absence of protein in Avery's transforming principle. Furthermore, the field of bacterial genetics was quickly becoming established, and biologists were more inclined to think of heredity in the same terms for bacteria and higher organisms. After Hershey and Chase used radioactive isotopes to show that it was primarily DNA, rather than protein, that entered bacteria upon infection with bacteriophage, it was soon widely accepted that DNA was the material. Despite the much less precise experimental results (they found a not-insignificant amount of protein entering the cells as well as DNA), the Hershey–Chase experiment was not subject to the same degree of challenge. Its influence was boosted by the growing network of the phage group and, the following year, by the publicity surrounding the DNA structure proposed by Watson and Crick (Watson was also a member of the phage group). Only in retrospect, however, did either experiment definitively prove that DNA is the genetic material.
