= Griffith's experiment =

Experiment demonstrating transfer of genetic information

Griffith's experiment discovering the "transforming principle" in Streptococcus pneumoniae (pneumococcal) bacteria.

Griffith's experiment, performed by Frederick Griffith and reported in 1928, was the first experiment suggesting that bacteria are capable of transferring genetic information through a process known as transformation. Griffith's findings were followed by research in the late 1930s and early 40s that isolated DNA as the material that communicated this genetic information.

Pneumonia was a serious cause of death in the wake of the post-WWI Spanish influenza pandemic, and Griffith was studying the possibility of creating a vaccine. Griffith used two strains of pneumococcus (Streptococcus pneumoniae) bacteria which infect mice – a type III-S (smooth) which was virulent, and a type II-R (rough) strain which was nonvirulent. The III-S strain synthesized a polysaccharide capsule that protected itself from the host's immune system, resulting in the death of the host, while the II-R strain did not have that protective capsule and was defeated by the host's immune system. A German bacteriologist, Fred Neufeld, had discovered the three pneumococcal types (Types I, II, and III) and discovered the quellung reaction to identify them in vitro. Until Griffith's experiment, bacteriologists believed that the types were fixed and unchangeable, from one generation to another.

In this experiment, bacteria from the III-S strain were killed by heat, and their remains were added to II-R strain bacteria. While neither alone harmed the mice, the combination was able to kill its host. Griffith was also able to isolate both live II-R and live III-S strains of pneumococcus from the blood of these dead mice. Griffith concluded that the type II-R had been "transformed" into the lethal III-S strain by a "transforming principle" that was somehow part of the dead III-S strain bacteria.

Scientific advances since then have revealed that the "transforming principle" Griffith observed was the DNA of the III-s strain bacteria. While the bacteria had been killed, the DNA had survived the heating process and was taken up by the II-R strain bacteria. The III-S strain DNA contains the genes that form the smooth protective polysaccharide capsule. Equipped with this gene, the former II-R strain bacteria were now protected from the host's immune system and could kill the host. The exact nature of the transforming principle (DNA) was verified in the experiments done by Avery, McLeod and McCarty and by Hershey and Chase.
