= Colin Munro MacLeod =

American geneticist

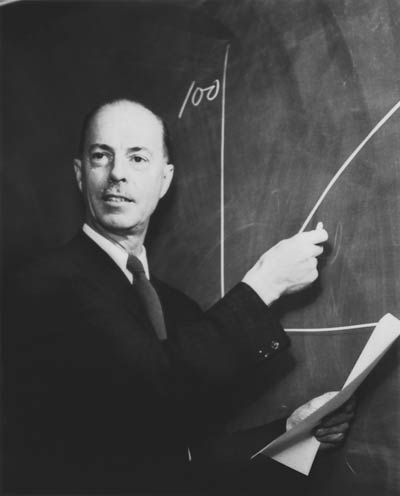
- Born: January 28, 1909; Port Hastings, Nova Scotia
- Died: February 11, 1972 (aged 63)
- Education: McGill University
- Known for: Avery–MacLeod–McCarty experiment
- Scientific career
- Workplaces: New York University School of Medicine, University of Pennsylvania, Cholera Research Laboratory, East Pakistan, Oklahoma Medical Research Foundation

Colin Munro MacLeod (January 28, 1909 – February 11, 1972) was a Canadian-American geneticist. He was one of a trio of scientists who discovered that deoxyribonucleic acid, or DNA is responsible for the transformation of the physical characteristics of bacteria, which subsequently led to its identification as the molecule responsible for heredity.

== Biography ==
MacLeod was born in Port Hastings, Nova Scotia, Canada, one of eight children of a schoolteacher and a Scottish Presbyterian minister. He entered McGill University at the age of 16 after skipping three grades in primary school, and completed his medical studies by age 23.

In his early years as a research scientist, MacLeod, with Oswald Avery and Maclyn McCarty, demonstrated DNA is the molecule responsible for bacterial transformation — and in retrospect, the physical basis of the gene. In 1941, Avery and MacLeod separated a crude extract from smooth ('S') strains of Streptococcus pneumoniae, the most common cause of bacterial pneumonia. The S strain extract could convert the more benign rough ('R') strains of pneumococci into the disease-causing S form. Later that year, McCarty joined the Avery laboratory, and in 1942, the group began to focus on DNA as the elusive ingredient in the S strain extract as the factor responsible for transformation of R pneumococci into S pneumococci. By early 1943, Avery, MacLeod, and McCarty had shown that DNA was the transforming factor, and in February 1944, published the first of a series of scientific papers in the Journal of Experimental Medicine demonstrating that DNA was the transforming principle. Subsequent experiments confirmed DNA as a universal bearer of genetic information. However, despite the enormous scientific importance of this work, which became known as the Avery–MacLeod–McCarty experiment, the trio did not win a Nobel Prize for their discovery.

MacLeod was diverted from research on Streptococcus pneumoniae and DNA to health and science issues related to the Second World War. At the time, microbial diseases such as typhus fever, malaria, and pneumonia posed significant threats to the health of U.S. military personnel. During the war, MacLeod was one of many university-based scientists and physicians who advised the federal government on medical matters "when asked." In 1941, he was appointed Chairman of the Department of Microbiology at New York University School of Medicine, and worked as a consultant to the U.S. Secretary of War. He became an official member of the Army Epidemiological Board, which in 1949 was enlarged to include all the armed forces and renamed the Armed Forces Epidemiological Board. MacLeod became president of the board in 1947, a position he held until 1955. The organization of the AFEB into twelve disease-related commissions foreshadowed the organization of the US-Japan Cooperative Medical Science Program into its disease-related panels.

At the end of World War II, Congress gave the National Institutes of Health authority to make external research awards, thereby creating its extramural programs, which nowadays constitute almost 90 percent of its funding. The NIH took over the funding of various research projects that had begun during the war, and MacLeod, from 1946 to 1949, served as a member of the first NIH study section, the Antibiotics Study Section. With his background in the newly renamed Department of Defense, MacLeod grew into the role of informal advisor to several NIH directors and served on various grant committees, commissions, and task forces. Thus, MacLeod had entered the third phase of his highly successful career—the first two being a laboratory research scientist and academic department head—with multiple forays into the realm of science policy and international health.

MacLeod was elected to membership in the National Academy of Sciences in 1955. In 1956, he gave up his position as head of microbiology at NYU, spent several years at the University of Pennsylvania, and then returned in 1960 to NYU as a professor of medicine. The same year, NIH Director James Shannon asked MacLeod to work with the Southeast Asia Treaty Organization to find ways to address the problem of cholera. Other scientists on the project were Joseph Smadel of the NIH, and Theodore Woodward and Fred L. Soper. (Woodward served as a U.S. delegation member from 1965 to 1995, and is now emeritus member.) MacLeod, Smadel, Woodward, Soper, and the other scientific advisors to SEATO recommended the establishment of a laboratory in Dacca, East Pakistan (now Dhaka, Bangladesh), that could conduct field research on cholera. Soper became the first director of the facility, initially called the Cholera Research Laboratory, and later renamed the International Centre for Diarrhoeal Disease Research, Bangladesh (ICDDR,B). Several years later, the newly formed USJCMSP Cholera Panels coordinated their cholera research and treatment activities with the Cholera Research Laboratory.

In 1961, MacLeod became the chairman of the Life Sciences Panel of President John F. Kennedy's Science Advisory Committee. In 1963, Kennedy appointed MacLeod as Deputy Director of the Office of Science and Technology, Executive Office of the President (now the White House Office of Science and Technology Policy). MacLeod was the first person to hold the position of deputy director of OST and remained there until 1966, serving as an advisor to President Lyndon B. Johnson after Kennedy's assassination. It has not been possible to find documents that confirm who conceived of a collaborative medical research enterprise between the United States and Japan. However, the idea is often attributed to MacLeod, who became chairman of the first U.S. delegation to the USJCMSP in 1965.

MacLeod was an elected member of the American Academy of Arts and Sciences and the American Philosophical Society. He was named President of the Oklahoma Medical Research Foundation in 1970. He remained in that position until his death in 1972.
