= Maclyn McCarty =

Biology research scientist, focused on DNA

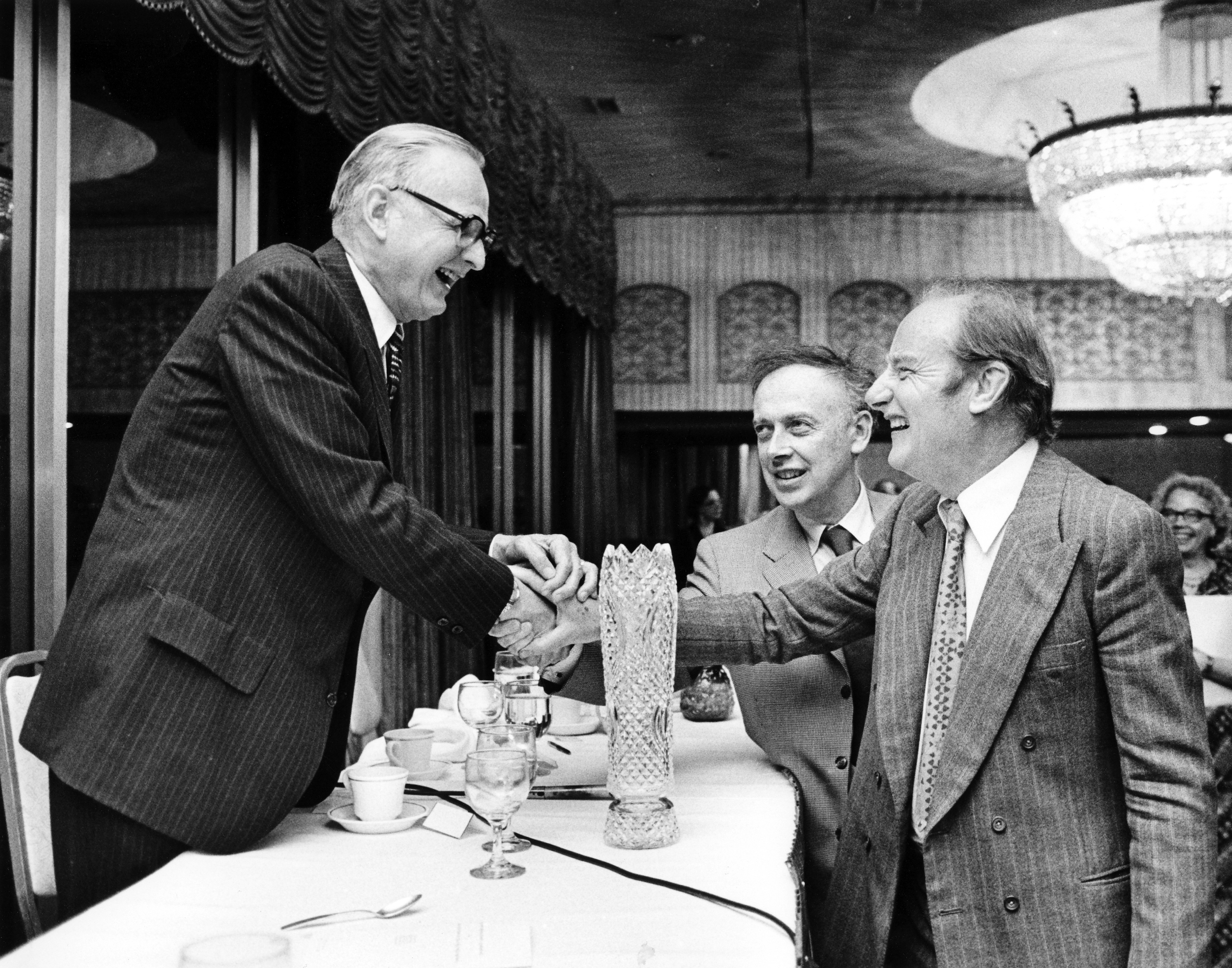
- Maclyn McCarty with Francis Crick and James D Watson
- Born: June 9, 1911; South Bend, Indiana
- Died: January 2, 2005 (aged 93)
- Known for: Role in the discovery that DNA is the carrier of genes
- Awards: Eli Lilly and Company-Elanco Research Award 1946; Robert Koch Prize (Gold, 1981); Wolf Prize for Medicine (1990)

Maclyn McCarty (June 9, 1911 – January 2, 2005) was an American geneticist, a research scientist described in 2005 as "the last surviving member of a Manhattan scientific team that overturned medical dogma in the 1940s and became the first to demonstrate that genes were made of DNA." He had worked at Rockefeller University "for more than 60 years." 1994 marked 50 years since this work's release.

McCarty devoted his life as a physician-scientist to studying infectious disease organisms, and was best known for his part in the monumental discovery that DNA, rather than protein, constituted the chemical nature of a gene. Uncovering the molecular secret of the gene in question — that for the capsular polysaccharide of pneumococcal bacteria — led the way to studying heredity not only through genetics but also through chemistry. The team responsible for this feat is known as the Avery–MacLeod–McCarty experiment. He died from congestive heart failure.

== Early life ==
McCarty was born in South Bend, Indiana. He was the second of four sons; his father was a branch manager for the Studebaker Corporation while it was still a firm for horse-drawn carriages.

As an undergraduate at Stanford University, he began his studies in the nascent field of biochemistry, working with James Murray Luck on protein turnover in the liver. He "graduated in 1933 from Stanford, where he majored in biochemistry" and then "went on to earn his medical degree at Johns Hopkins University in 1937." After four more years there and at New York University "he moved to Rockefeller" where he met his future research teammates.

== Early Rockefeller years ==
MacLeod, over a number of years of research, had resolved several thorny technical issues, so that by the time McCarty arrived at the Rockefeller University, Avery's team had paved the way for McCarty. Their progress over the next three years is described in McCarty's memoir The Transforming Principle, written in the early 1980s.

McCarty's arrival at Rockefeller University was also marked by another milestone, namely, the development of a reagent assay to positively correlate DNA with biological activity. In 1944 they published in the Journal of Experimental Medicine about their work.

Acceptance of the concept that "genes are DNA" was a slow process. Skepticism and being ignored, at least in the New York research institutions abounded. There were challenges associated with research, which made it especially difficult to attract other investigators to pursue it. Few people had the necessary expertise. One needed to use mice for corroboration. However, by 1953, influenced by the enormous impact of Watson and Crick's bihelical structure of DNA, the majority of researchers had fully accepted the 1944 paper.

== Later career years ==
A 1946 retirement resulted in McCarty being asked to head a specialized 1922-established laboratory. This lab was the scientific home of Rebecca Lancefield, who developed a major classification system. His work, combined with hers, made it clear that conditions affecting the joints and the heart resulted from infections several weeks earlier. The causal chain of events still eludes us. McCarty attacked this problem by studying both the biology and Rockefeller Hospital patients with acute rheumatic fever.

Together with his students and collaborators, over the next 20 years, McCarty's work changed the understanding of the organism from a gram-positive streptococcus with a particular serological characteristic to one of the best characterized bacterial species. Work on bacterial cell-wall anatomy and chemistry was just beginning. His work led to the isolation of the streptococcal cell wall as a structural entity suitable for anatomic inspection by electronmicroscopy. Chemical dissection led to characterization of the group A–specific polysaccharide and the peptidoglycan, and the identification of its serological specificity in the terminal hexosamine. In order to prove this specificity, he first had to identify and purify a specific enzyme that cleaved hexosamine (a hexosaminidase) from a soil organism. Treating the polysaccharide with this enzyme abrogated its serological reactivity. McCarty further demonstrated the precise configuration of the hexosamine linkage by synthesizing both α- and β-N-acetyl-glucosamine ovalbumin and showing that only the second reacted with group A antisera. A similar analytical strategy indicated that the polysaccharide of group C streptococci differed by having a terminal β-N-acetyl galactosamine as the serological determinant.

In parallel, McCarty studied patients with rheumatic fever admitted to the Rockefeller Hospital as well as valuable specimen collections from military outbreaks of the disease during World War II. He and his collaborators found that antibody responses to several streptococcal antigens were significantly higher in the group of individuals that developed acute rheumatic fever than in individuals with uncomplicated infection. However, the response to unrelated antigens, for instance, diphtheria toxoid, was not enhanced. He found that group A streptococci secreted unusually high amounts of DNase, and established a test for the detection of antibodies produced in response to this antigen. This led to the discovery that streptococci were able to produce multiple isozymes of DNase. He purified human C-reactive protein through crystallization, produced a highly specific antiserum, and, using this much simpler and more sensitive test, found that C-reactive protein levels responded more rapidly and reliably than other inflammatory markers and could serve as the most accurate indicator of rheumatic inflammatory activity. Measuring C-reactive protein levels to detect inflammation is routine now in medical practice.

In his later years, McCarty increasingly served as a statesman of the biomedical sciences. He served for 14 years as the physician-in-chief of the Rockefeller University Hospital, and as a trusted adviser and the vice president of the Rockefeller University. Outside the university, his leadership was sought by the New York City Health Research Council, the Helen Hay Whitney Foundation, the Institute of Medicine (as a charter member), and numerous university visiting boards. For more than 40 years, as editor, he placed his stamp of excellence and integrity on the Journal of Experimental Medicine. He was a member of the United States National Academy of Sciences, the American Academy of Arts and Sciences, and the American Philosophical Society.

== Personal life ==
McCarty's scientific interests and energy had a counterpart in his rich personal life. Along with his second wife, Marjorie, McCarty had a wide circle of very close friends, both in the United States and abroad, who cherished his personal warmth, his low key, spare, and pragmatic character, his wit, and his wide-ranging intellect. He loved English literature, theater, and symphonies. He loved to wander the streets and the museums of the great cities of the world, particularly, Paris, New York, and London, and frequently visited overseas following his retirement. Moreover, he remained close to his family; the four brothers, living in different parts of the country, never failed to meet for annual reunions.

== Sources ==
- Lederberg, Joshua; Gotschlich, Emil C (2005). "A Path to Discovery: The Career of Maclyn McCarty". PLOS Biology. 3 (10): e341. doi:10.1371/journal.pbio.0030341. PMC 1250295. PMID 16207076.

This article incorporates text by Joshua Lederberg and Emil C Gotschlich available under the CC BY 2.0 license.
