= Rollin Hotchkiss =

American biochemist

Rollin Douglas Hotchkiss (September 8, 1911 – December 12, 2004) was an American biochemist who helped to establish the role of DNA as the genetic material and contributed to the isolation and purification of the first antibiotics. His work on bacterial transformation helped lay the groundwork for the field of molecular genetics.

== Education ==
Hotchkiss was born in South Britain, Connecticut. The son of factory workers, he attended Yale University after scoring the highest in the nation on an achievement test. Hotchkiss earned a B.S. in chemistry in 1932, and remained at Yale for a Ph.D. in organic chemistry. After completing his doctoral work in 1935, Hotchkiss became a fellow of the Rockefeller Institute of Medical Research, where he would remain until retirement in 1982.

== Research career ==
At the Rockefeller Institute, Hotchkiss initially worked as an assistant to Oswald Avery and Walter Goebel, and was encouraged to learn more biology at a summer courses at the Marine Biological Laboratory. His early work isolating and synthesizing derivatives of glucoronic acid led to the identification of one of the specific polysaccharides in the capsule of type III pneumococci. Hotchkiss spent the 1937–1938 academic year in the lab of Heinz Holter and Kaj Linderstrøm-Lang at Carlsberg Laboratory learning protein analysis techniques. In 1938, he began collaborating with René Dubos to isolate and study antibiotics produced by soil bacteria. Their work on gramicidin and tyrocidine led to the first commercial antibiotics, and with Fritz Lipmann they found that the antibiotics include D-amino acids.

During the late 1930s, Hotchkiss was also strongly critical of the Bergann–Niemann hypothesis of protein structure, the proposal by fellow Rockefeller biochemists Max Bergmann and Carl Niemann that protein structures always consist of multiples of 288 amino acids. (This would also be a feature of Dorothy Wrinch's cyclol hypothesis of protein structure).

In 1946, in the wake of the Avery–MacLeod–McCarty experiment showing that DNA, not protein, had the power to transform bacteria from one type to another, Hotchkiss rejoined Avery's lab. His work on protein analysis helped answer Avery's critics who argued that the experiment was not sufficiently rigorous to rule out protein contamination (and thus the possibility that protein was the transforming factor). Hotchkiss found that virtually all the detected nitrogen in the purified DNA used in for the transformation experiments came from glycine, a breakdown product of the nucleotide base adenine, and estimated that undetected protein contamination was at most .02%, although he did not publish this result until 1952 (the year of the Hershey–Chase experiment). In 1948 Hotchkiss used paper chromatography to quantify the base composition of DNA and, independently of Erwin Chargaff, found that the base ratios differed from species to species.

In 1951, Hotchkiss showed that purified bacterial DNA could be used to transfer penicillin resistance from one strain of bacteria to another without changing the capsule type (the main identifying feature of different types of the same bacterial species). His subsequent worked helped establish the basics of bacterial genetics, showing that many features of classical genetics (including genetic linkage) have parallels in bacteria, despite their lack of chromosomes. Hotchkiss continued working in molecular genetics until his retirement in 1982, including significant collaborations with Julius Marmur, Maurice Fox, Alexander Tomasz, Joan Kent, Sanford Lacks, Elena Ottolenghi, and his wife Magda Gabor-Hotchkiss.

In the mid-1960s, Hotchkiss became interested in the potential dangers of genetic engineering (a term he helped to popularize). Through the early 1970s he articulated many of the concerns that led to the 1975 Asilomar Conference on Recombinant DNA.

Hotchkiss was a member of the American Academy of Arts and Sciences and the National Academy of Sciences (elected in 1961), and served as president of the Genetics Society of America from 1971 to 1972. After leaving Rockefeller University in 1982, he worked as a research professor at the University at Albany, SUNY, until retiring to Lenox, Massachusetts in 1986. Hotchkiss died December 12, 2004, of congestive heart failure.

== Notes and references ==
            5. ∧ r o l l i n d o u g l a s h o t c h k i s s
