= Cyclol =

Structural model of a folded, globular protein

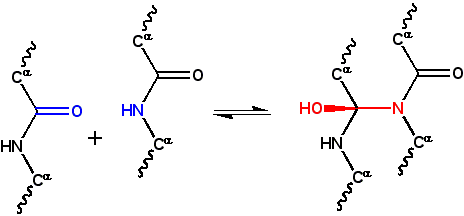
Figure 1: In the classic cyclol reaction, two peptide groups are linked by a N-C' bond, converting the carbonyl oxygen into a hydroxyl group. Although this reaction occurs in a few cyclic peptides, it is disfavored by free energy, mainly because it eliminates the resonance stabilization of the peptide bond. This reaction was the basis of Dorothy Wrinch's cyclol model of proteins.

The cyclol hypothesis is the now discredited first structural model of a folded, globular protein, formulated in the 1930s. It was based on the cyclol reaction of peptide bonds proposed by physicist Charles Frank in 1936, in which two peptide groups are chemically crosslinked. These crosslinks are covalent analogs of the non-covalent hydrogen bonds between peptide groups and have been observed in rare cases, such as the ergopeptides.

Based on this reaction, mathematician Dorothy Wrinch hypothesized in a series of five papers in the late 1930s a structural model of globular proteins. She postulated that, under some conditions, amino acids will spontaneously make the maximum possible number of cyclol crosslinks, resulting in cyclol molecules and cyclol fabrics. She further proposed that globular proteins have a tertiary structure corresponding to Platonic solids and semiregular polyhedra formed of cyclol fabrics with no free edges. In contrast to the cyclol reaction itself, these hypothetical molecules, fabrics and polyhedra have not been observed experimentally. The model has several consequences that render it energetically implausible, such as steric clashes between the protein sidechains. In response to such criticisms J. D. Bernal proposed that hydrophobic interactions are chiefly responsible for protein folding, which was indeed borne out.

== Historical context ==
By the mid-1930s, analytical ultracentrifugation studies by Theodor Svedberg had shown that proteins had a well-defined chemical structure, and were not aggregations of small molecules. The same studies appeared to show that the molecular weight of proteins fell into a few well-defined classes related by integers, such as M_{w} = 2^{p}3^{q} Da, where p and q are nonnegative integers. However, it was difficult to determine the exact molecular weight and number of amino acids in a protein. Svedberg had also shown that a change in solution conditions could cause a protein to disassemble into small subunits, now known as a change in quaternary structure.

The chemical structure of proteins was still under debate at that time. The most accepted (and ultimately correct) hypothesis was that proteins are linear polypeptides, i.e., unbranched polymers of amino acids linked by peptide bonds. However, a typical protein is remarkably long—hundreds of amino-acid residues—and several distinguished scientists were unsure whether such long, linear macromolecules could be stable in solution. Further doubts about the polypeptide nature of proteins arose because some enzymes were observed to cleave proteins but not peptides, whereas other enzymes cleave peptides but not folded proteins. Attempts to synthesize proteins in the test tube were unsuccessful, mainly due to the chirality of amino acids; naturally occurring proteins are composed of only left-handed amino acids. Hence, alternative chemical models of proteins were considered, such as the diketopiperazine hypothesis of Emil Abderhalden. However, no alternative model had yet explained why proteins yield only amino acids and peptides upon hydrolysis and proteolysis. As clarified by Linderstrøm-Lang, these proteolysis data showed that denatured proteins were polypeptides, but no data had yet been obtained about the structure of folded proteins; thus, denaturation could involve a chemical change that converted folded proteins into polypeptides.

The process of protein denaturation (as distinguished from coagulation) had been discovered in 1910 by Harriette Chick and Charles Martin, but its nature was still mysterious. Tim Anson and Alfred Mirsky had shown that denaturation was a reversible, two-state process that results in many chemical groups becoming available for chemical reactions, including cleavage by enzymes. In 1929, Hsien Wu hypothesized correctly that denaturation corresponded to protein unfolding, a purely conformational change that resulted in the exposure of amino-acid side chains to the solvent. Wu's hypothesis was also advanced independently in 1936 by Mirsky and Linus Pauling. Nevertheless, protein scientists could not exclude the possibility that denaturation corresponded to a chemical change in the protein structure, a hypothesis that was considered a (distant) possibility until the 1950s.

X-ray crystallography had just begun as a discipline in 1911, and had advanced relatively rapidly from simple salt crystals to crystals of complex molecules such as cholesterol. However, even the smallest proteins have over 1000 atoms, which makes determining their structure far more complex. In 1934, Dorothy Crowfoot Hodgkin had taken crystallographic data on the structure of the small protein, insulin, although the structure of that and other proteins were not solved until the late 1960s. However, pioneering X-ray fiber diffraction data had been collected in the early 1930s for many natural fibrous proteins such as wool and hair by William Astbury, who suggested that "globular proteins in general might be folded from elements essentially like the elements of fibrous proteins."

Since protein structure was so poorly understood in the 1930s, the physical interactions responsible for stabilizing that structure were likewise unknown. Astbury hypothesized that the structure of fibrous proteins was stabilized by hydrogen bonds in β-sheets. The idea that globular proteins are also stabilized by hydrogen bonds was proposed by Dorothy Jordan Lloyd in 1932, and championed later by Alfred Mirsky and Linus Pauling. At a 1933 lecture by Astbury to the Oxford Junior Scientific Society, physicist Charles Frank suggested that the fibrous protein α-keratin might be stabilized by an alternative mechanism, namely, covalent crosslinking of the peptide bonds by the cyclol reaction above. The cyclol crosslink draws the two peptide groups close together; the N and C atoms are separated by ~1.5 Å, whereas they are separated by ~3 Å in a typical hydrogen bond. The idea intrigued J. D. Bernal, who suggested it to the mathematician Dorothy Wrinch as possibly useful in understanding protein structure.

== Basic theory ==
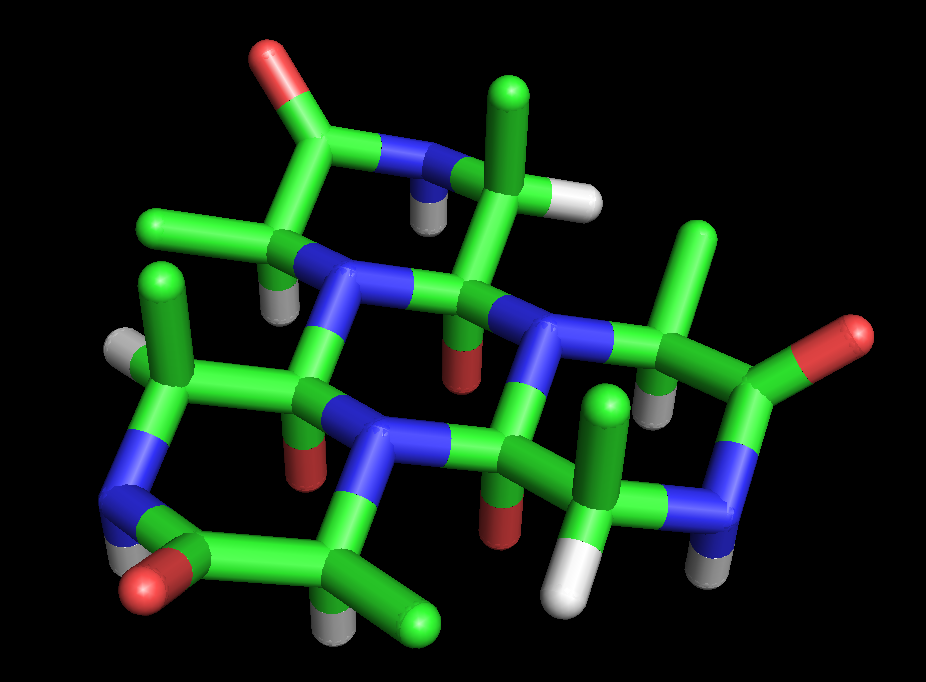
Figure 2: The alanine cyclol-6 molecule proposed by Dorothy Wrinch is a cyclic hexapeptide in which three peptide groups are fused by cyclol reactions into a central ring. The three outer (unfused) peptide groups are not planar, but have dihedral angle ω=60°. The three red atoms in the central ring represent the hydroxyl groups formed by the cyclol reactions, whereas the three outer red atoms represent the oxygens of carbonyl groups. The inner oxygen atoms are separated by only 2.45 Å, which is extremely close even for hydrogen-bonded atoms. This hypothetical molecule has not been observed in nature.

Wrinch developed this suggestion into a full-fledged model of protein structure. The basic cyclol model was laid out in her first paper (1936). She noted the possibility that polypeptides might cyclize to form closed rings (true) and that these rings might form internal crosslinks through the cyclol reaction (also true, although rare). Assuming that the cyclol form of the peptide bond could be more stable than the amide form, Wrinch concluded that certain cyclic peptides would naturally make the maximal number of cyclol bonds (such as cyclol 6, Figure 2). Such cyclol molecules would have hexagonal symmetry, if the chemical bonds were taken as having the same length, roughly 1.5 Å; for comparison, the N-C and C-C bonds have the lengths 1.42 Å and 1.54 Å, respectively.

These rings can be extended indefinitely to form a cyclol fabric (Figure 3). Such fabrics exhibit a long-range, quasi-crystalline order that Wrinch felt was likely in proteins, since they must pack hundreds of residues densely. Another interesting feature of such molecules and fabrics is that their amino-acid side chains point axially upwards from only one face; the opposite face has no side chains. Thus, one face is completely independent of the primary sequence of the peptide, which Wrinch conjectured might account for sequence-independent properties of proteins.

In her initial article, Wrinch stated clearly that the cyclol model was merely a working hypothesis, a potentially valid model of proteins that would have to be checked. Her goals in this article and its successors were to propose a well-defined testable model, to work out the consequences of its assumptions and to make predictions that could be tested experimentally. In these goals, she succeeded; however, within a few years, experiments and further modeling showed that the cyclol hypothesis was untenable as a model for globular proteins.

== Stabilizing energies ==
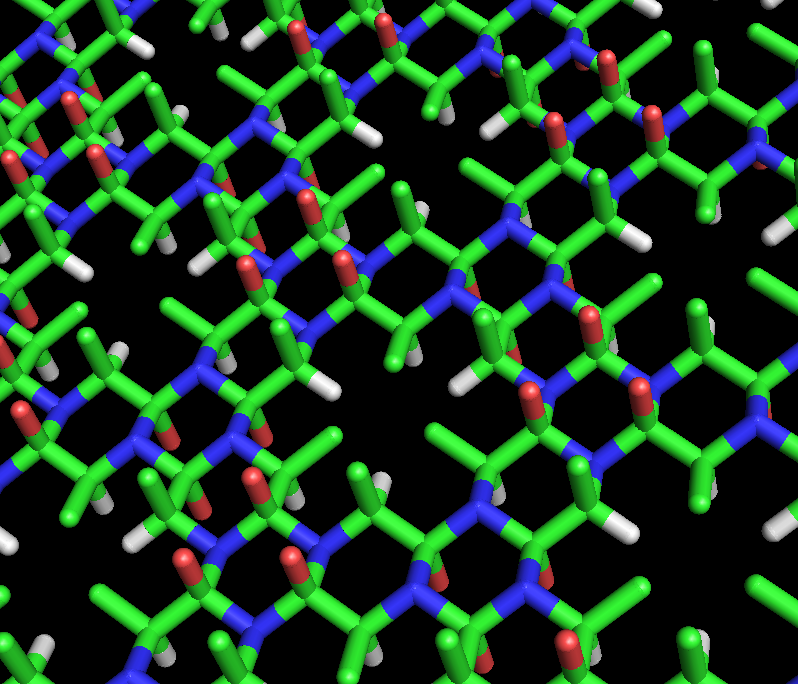
Figure 3: Stick model of the alanine cyclol fabric proposed by Dorothy Wrinch. The cyclol fabric is conceptually similar to a beta sheet, but more uniform and laterally denser. The fabric has large "lacunae" arranged in a hexagonal pattern, in which three C^{β} atoms (shown in green) and three H^{α} atoms (shown in white) converge on a (relatively) empty spot in the fabric. The two sides of the fabric are not equivalent; all the C^{β} atoms emerge from the same side, which is the "upper" side here. The red atoms represent hydroxyl groups (not carbonyl groups) and emerge (in sets of three) from both sides of the fabric; the blue atoms represent nitrogen. This hypothetical structure has not been observed in nature.

In two tandem Letters to the Editor (1936), Wrinch and Frank addressed the question of whether the cyclol form of the peptide group was indeed more stable than the amide form. A relatively simple calculation showed that the cyclol form is significantly less stable than the amide form. Therefore, the cyclol model would have to be abandoned unless a compensating source of energy could be identified. Initially, Frank proposed that the cyclol form might be stabilized by better interactions with the surrounding solvent; later, Wrinch and Irving Langmuir hypothesized that hydrophobic association of nonpolar sidechains provides stabilizing energy to overcome the energetic cost of the cyclol reactions.

The lability of the cyclol bond was seen as an advantage of the model, since it provided a natural explanation for the properties of denaturation; reversion of cyclol bonds to their more stable amide form would open up the structure and allows those bonds to be attacked by proteases, consistent with experiment. Early studies showed that proteins denatured by pressure are often in a different state than the same proteins denatured by high temperature, which was interpreted as possibly supporting the cyclol model of denaturation.

The Langmuir-Wrinch hypothesis of hydrophobic stabilization shared in the downfall of the cyclol model, owing mainly to the influence of Linus Pauling, who favored the hypothesis that protein structure was stabilized by hydrogen bonds. Another twenty years had to pass before hydrophobic interactions were recognized as the chief driving force in protein folding.

== Steric complementarity ==
In her third paper on cyclols (1936), Wrinch noted that many "physiologically active" substances such as steroids are composed of fused hexagonal rings of carbon atoms and, thus, might be sterically complementary to the face of cyclol molecules without the amino-acid side chains. Wrinch proposed that steric complementarity was one of chief factors in determining whether a small molecule would bind to a protein.

Wrinch speculated that proteins are responsible for the synthesis of all biological molecules. Noting that cells digest their proteins only under extreme starvation conditions, Wrinch further speculated that life could not exist without proteins.

== Hybrid models ==
From the beginning, the cyclol reaction was considered as a covalent analog of the hydrogen bond. Therefore, it was natural to consider hybrid models with both types of bonds. This was the subject of Wrinch's fourth paper on the cyclol model (1936), written together with Dorothy Jordan Lloyd, who first proposed that globular proteins are stabilized by hydrogen bonds. A follow-up paper was written in 1937 that referenced other researchers on hydrogen bonding in proteins, such as Maurice Loyal Huggins and Linus Pauling.

Wrinch also wrote a paper with William Astbury, noting the possibility of a keto-enol isomerization of the >C^{α}H^{α} and an amide carbonyl group >C=O, producing a crosslink >C^{α}-C(OH^{α})< and again converting the oxygen to a hydroxyl group. Such reactions could yield five-membered rings, whereas the classic cyclol hypothesis produces six-membered rings. This keto-enol crosslink hypothesis was not developed much further.

== Space-enclosing fabrics ==
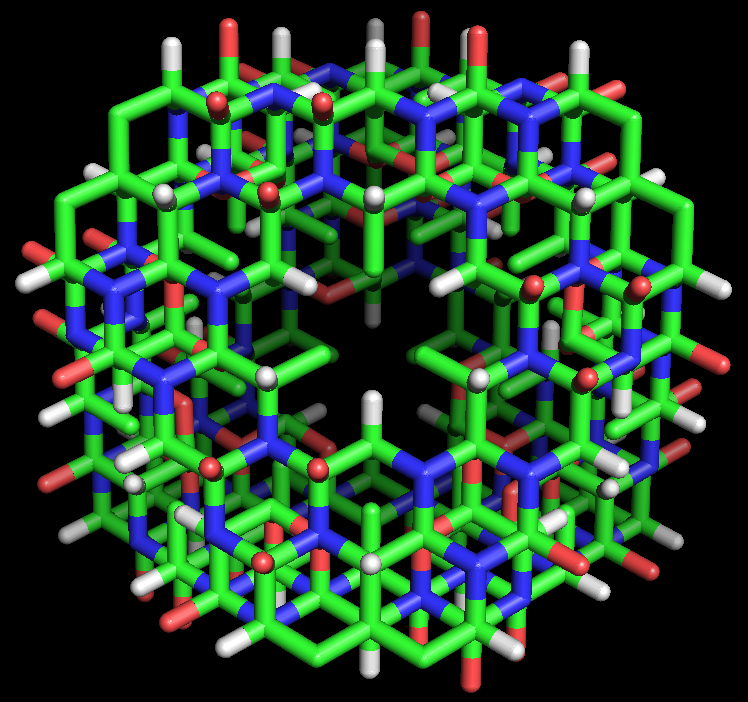
Figure 4: Stick model of the cyclol C_{1} protein structure proposed by Dorothy Wrinch. The molecule is a truncated tetrahedron composed of four planar cyclol fabrics, each surrounding one lacuna (48 residues), and joined together pairwise by four residues along each edge (two residues at each corner). Thus, this molecule has 72 amino-acid residues altogether. It is viewed here "face-on", i.e., looking into the lacuna of one cyclol fabric. The side chains (taken here as alanine) all point into the interior of this "cage-like" structure. This hypothetical structure has not been observed in nature.

In her fifth paper on cyclols (1937), Wrinch identified the conditions under which two planar cyclol fabrics could be joined to make an angle between their planes while respecting the chemical bond angles. She identified a mathematical simplification, in which the non-planar six-membered rings of atoms can be represented by planar "median hexagon"s made from the midpoints of the chemical bonds. This "median hexagon" representation made it easy to see that the cyclol fabric planes can be joined correctly if the dihedral angle between the planes equals the tetrahedral bond angle δ = arccos(-1/3) ≈ 109.47°.

A large variety of closed polyhedra meeting this criterion can be constructed, of which the simplest are the truncated tetrahedron, the truncated octahedron, and the octahedron, which are Platonic solids or semiregular polyhedra. Considering the first series of "closed cyclols" (those modeled on the truncated tetrahedron), Wrinch showed that their number of amino acids increased quadratically as 72n^{2}, where n is the index of the closed cyclol C_{n}. Thus, the C_{1} cyclol has 72 residues, the C_{2} cyclol has 288 residues, etc. Preliminary experimental support for this prediction came from Max Bergmann and Carl Niemann, whose amino-acid analyses suggested that proteins were composed of integer multiples of 288 amino-acid residues (n=2). More generally, the cyclol model of globular proteins accounted for the early analytical ultracentrifugation results of Theodor Svedberg, which suggested that the molecular weights of proteins fell into a few classes related by integers.

The cyclol model was consistent with the general properties then attributed to folded proteins. (1) Centrifugation studies had shown that folded proteins were significantly denser than water (~1.4 g/mL) and, thus, tightly packed; Wrinch assumed that dense packing should imply regular packing. (2) Despite their large size, some proteins crystallize readily into symmetric crystals, consistent with the idea of symmetric faces that match up upon association. (3) Proteins bind metal ions; since metal-binding sites must have specific bond geometries (e.g., octahedral), it was plausible to assume that the entire protein also had similarly crystalline geometry. (4) As described above, the cyclol model provided a simple chemical explanation of denaturation and the difficulty of cleaving folded proteins with proteases. (5) Proteins were assumed to be responsible for the synthesis of all biological molecules, including other proteins. Wrinch noted that a fixed, uniform structure would be useful for proteins in templating their own synthesis, analogous to the Watson-Francis Crick concept of DNA templating its own replication. Given that many biological molecules such as sugars and sterols have a hexagonal structure, it was plausible to assume that their synthesizing proteins likewise had a hexagonal structure. Wrinch summarized her model and the supporting molecular-weight experimental data in three review articles.

== Predicted protein structures ==
Having proposed a model of globular proteins, Wrinch investigated whether it was consistent with the available structural data. She hypothesized that bovine tuberculin protein (523) was a C_{1} closed cyclol consisting of 72 residues and that the digestive enzyme pepsin was a C_{2} closed cyclol of 288 residues. These residue-number predictions were difficult to verify, since the methods then available to measure the mass of proteins were inaccurate, such as analytical ultracentrifugation and chemical methods.

Wrinch also predicted that insulin was a C_{2} closed cyclol consisting of 288 residues. Limited X-ray crystallographic data were available for insulin which Wrinch interpreted as "confirming" her model. However, this interpretation drew rather severe criticism for being premature. Careful studies of the Patterson diagrams of insulin taken by Dorothy Crowfoot Hodgkin showed that they were roughly consistent with the cyclol model; however, the agreement was not good enough to claim that the cyclol model was confirmed.

== Implausibility of the model ==
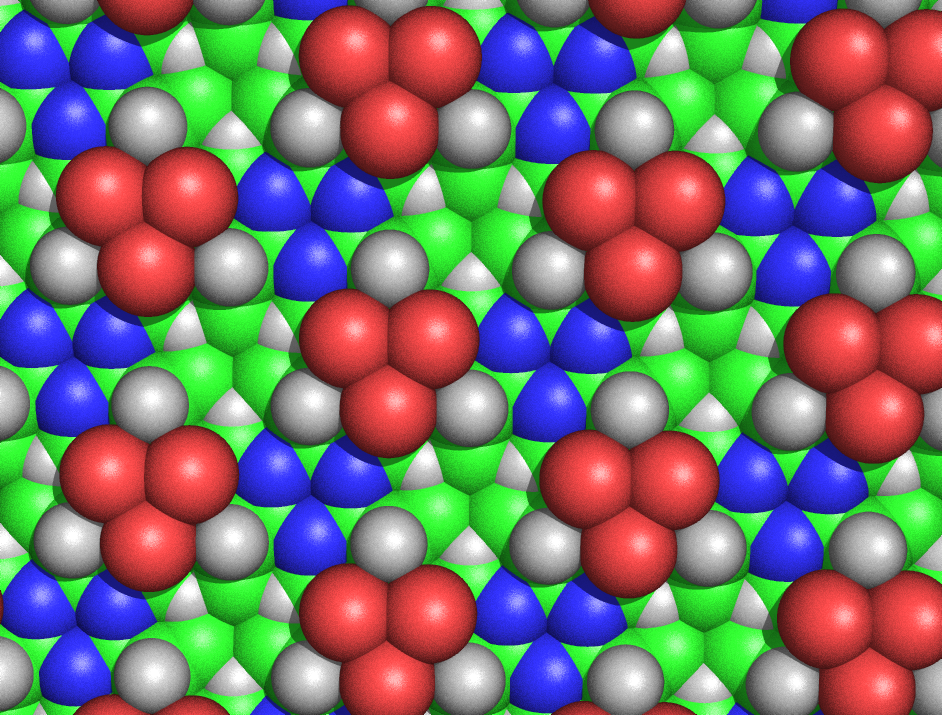
Figure 5: Spacefilling diagram of the alanine cyclol fabric, as seen from the side where none of the C^{β} atoms emerge. This Figure shows the threefold symmetry of the fabric and also its extraordinary density; for example, in the "lacunae"—where three C^{β} atoms (shown in green) and three H^{α} atoms (shown as white triangles) converge—the carbons and hydrogens are separated by only 1.68 Å. The larger green spheres represent the C^{β} atoms; the C^{α} atoms are generally not visible, except as little triangles next to the blue nitrogen atoms. As before, the red atoms represent hydroxyl groups, not carbonyl oxygen atoms.

The cyclol fabric was shown to be implausible for several reasons. Hans Neurath and Henry Bull showed that the dense packing of side chains in the cyclol fabric was inconsistent with the experimental density observed in protein films. Maurice Huggins calculated that several non-bonded atoms of the cyclol fabric would approach more closely than allowed by their van der Waals radii; for example, the inner H^{α} and C^{α} atoms of the lacunae would be separated by only 1.68 Å (Figure 5). Haurowitz showed chemically that the outside of proteins could not have a large number of hydroxyl groups, a key prediction of the cyclol model, whereas Meyer and Hohenemser showed that cyclol condensations of amino acids did not exist even in minute quantities as a transition state. More general chemical arguments against the cyclol model were given by Bergmann and Niemann and by Neuberger. Infrared spectroscopic data showed that the number of carbonyl groups in a protein did not change upon hydrolysis, and that intact, folded proteins have a full complement of amide carbonyl groups; both observations contradict the cyclol hypothesis that such carbonyls are converted to hydroxyl groups in folded proteins. Finally, proteins were known to contain proline in significant quantities (typically 5%); since proline lacks the amide hydrogen and its nitrogen already forms three covalent bonds, proline seems incapable of the cyclol reaction and of being incorporated into a cyclol fabric. An encyclopedic summary of the chemical and structural evidence against the cyclol model was given by Pauling and Niemann. Moreover, a supporting piece of evidence—the result that all proteins contain an integer multiple of 288 amino-acid residues—was likewise shown to be incorrect in 1939.

Wrinch replied to the steric-clash, free-energy, chemical and residue-number criticisms of the cyclol model. On steric clashes, she noted that small deformations of the bond angles and bond lengths would allow these steric clashes to be relieved, or at least reduced to a reasonable level. She noted that distances between non-bonded groups within a single molecule can be shorter than expected from their van der Waals radii, e.g., the 2.93 Å distance between methyl groups in hexamethylbenzene. Regarding the free-energy penalty for the cyclol reaction, Wrinch disagreed with Pauling's calculations and stated that too little was known of intramolecular energies to rule out the cyclol model on that basis alone. In reply to the chemical criticisms, Wrinch suggested that the model compounds and simple bimolecular reactions studied need not pertain to the cyclol model, and that steric hindrance may have prevented the surface hydroxyl groups from reacting. On the residue-number criticism, Wrinch extended her model to allow for other numbers of residues. In particular, she produced a "minimal" closed cyclol of only 48 residues, and, on that (incorrect) basis, may have been the first to suggest that the insulin monomer had a molecular weight of roughly 6000 Da.

Therefore, she maintained that the cyclol model of globular proteins was still potentially viable and even proposed the cyclol fabric as a component of the cytoskeleton. However, most protein scientists ceased to believe in it and Wrinch turned her scientific attention to mathematical problems in X-ray crystallography, to which she contributed significantly. One exception was physicist Gladys Anslow, Wrinch's colleague at Smith College, who studied the ultraviolet absorption spectra of proteins and peptides in the 1940s and allowed for the possibility of cyclols in interpreting her results. As the sequence of insulin began to be determined by Frederick Sanger, Anslow published a three-dimensional cyclol model with sidechains, based on the backbone of Wrinch's 1948 "minimal cyclol" model.

== Partial redemption ==
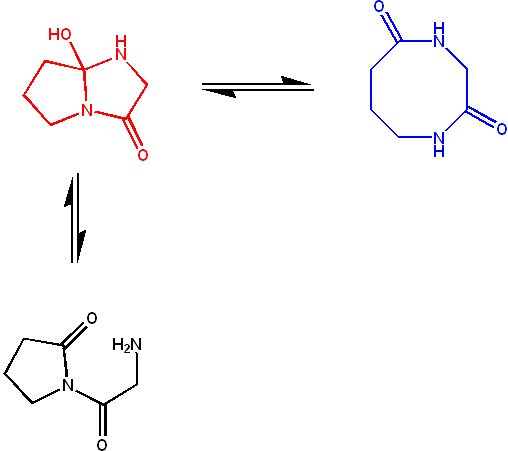
Figure 6: A typical azacyclol molecule (red) in a rapid equilibrium with its bislactam macrocycle form (blue). The amide groups of the bislactam form are crosslinked in the cyclol form; these two tautomers have similar stability, giving an equilibrium constant of ~1. However, the open form (black) is unstable, and not observed.

The downfall of the overall cyclol model generally led to a rejection of its elements; one notable exception was J. D. Bernal's short-lived acceptance of the Langmuir-Wrinch hypothesis that protein folding is driven by hydrophobic association. Nevertheless, cyclol bonds were identified in small, naturally occurring cyclic peptides in the 1950s.

Clarification of the modern terminology is appropriate. The classic cyclol reaction is the addition of the NH amine of a peptide group to the C=O carbonyl group of another; the resulting compound is now called an azacyclol. By analogy, an oxacyclol is formed when an OH hydroxyl group is added to a peptidyl carbonyl group. Likewise, a thiacyclol is formed by adding an SH thiol moiety to a peptidyl carbonyl group.

The oxacyclol alkaloid ergotamine from the fungus Claviceps purpurea was the first identified cyclol. The cyclic depsipeptide serratamolide is also formed by an oxacyclol reaction. Chemically analogous cyclic thiacyclols have also been obtained. Classic azacyclols have been observed in small molecules and tripeptides. Peptides are naturally produced from the reversion of azacylols, a key prediction of the cyclol model. Hundreds of cyclol molecules have now been identified, despite Linus Pauling's calculation that such molecules should not exist because of their unfavorably high energy.

After a long hiatus during which she worked mainly on the mathematics of X-ray crystallography, Wrinch responded to these discoveries with renewed enthusiasm for the cyclol model and its relevance in biochemistry. She also published two books describing the cyclol theory and small peptides in general.
