= Sjöstedt =

Sjöstedt or Sjoestedt is a surname of Swedish origin. Notable people with the surname include:

- Carl-Erik Sjöstedt, (1900–1979), Swedish mathematician and teacher
- Bengt Sjöstedt (1906–1981), Finnish hurdler
- Bror Yngve Sjöstedt (1866–1948), Swedish naturalist
- Jonas Sjöstedt (born 1964), Swedish politician
- Rasmus Sjöstedt (born 1992), Swedish footballer
- Sture Sjöstedt (1916–2008), Swedish actor and film producer
- Thure Sjöstedt (1903–1956), Swedish wrestler
- Marie-Louise Sjoestedt-Jonval (1900–1940), French linguist and literary scholar
- Anshelm Sjöstedt-Jussila (1869–1926), Finnish politician
