= Harald Nordenson =

Swedish chemist, industrialist and politician

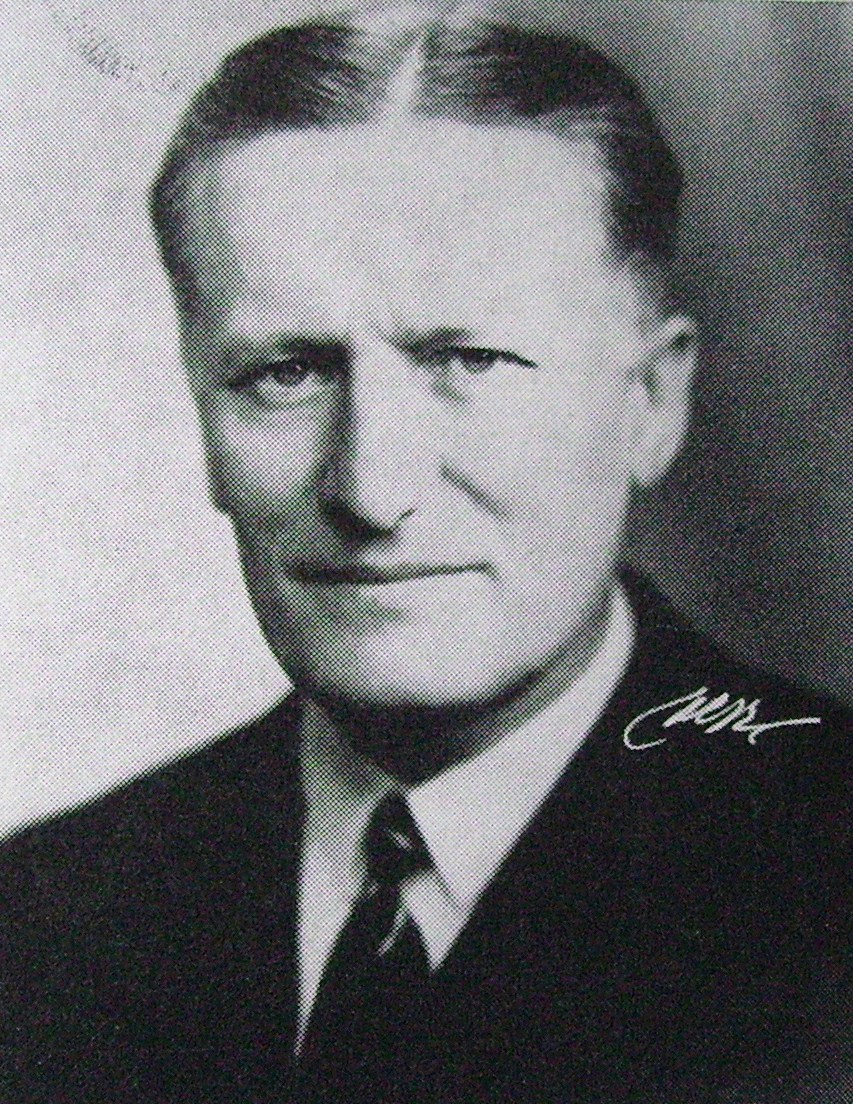
Harald Nordenson

Harald Nordenson (1886–1980) was a Swedish chemist, industrialist and politician best known for his criticisms of the theory of relativity.

== Biography ==
Nordenson was born in Göttingen, Germany on August 10, 1886 as the son of ophthalmologist Erik Nordenson and his wife Bertha Nordenson, a descendant of Lars Johan Hierta and later a prominent women's activist. He matriculated at Uppsala University in 1906, graduated with a bachelor's degree in 1910, a licentiate degree in 1912 and earned his Ph.D. in physical chemistry in 1914, working on colloidal solutions.

Nordenson's choice of subject in Uppsala, physical chemistry, meant that he became part of the circle around Theodor Svedberg, who had become a famous scientist already around 1910 and who won the Nobel Prize in Chemistry in 1926. Nordenson served as assistant professor (docent) in physical chemistry in Uppsala 1914–1919. Simultaneous with his research in chemistry, he cultivated an interest in philosophy through his contacts with professor Adolf Phalén, who regarded the analysis of concepts as the most important area of philosophy. This led Nordenson to subject Albert Einstein's theories to a thorough philosophical scrutiny, which led to his first book about Einstein's theories in Swedish in 1922. This book made him a licentiate in theoretical philosophy in Uppsala. It was later developed into his 1969 English book, Relativity, Time and Reality. He studied the philosophy of Axel Hägerström and Phalén, and describes also their opinions about Einstein's theories in his book, together with reviews of many other contributors.

His book, Relativity, Time and Reality, is a controversial critique of Albert Einstein's concepts of time and simultaneity in special relativity. Nordenson attacked Einstein's theory from rules of logic and concluded that "The Theory of Relativity is not physics but philosophy and in my opinion poor philosophy". His arguments have been generally considered invalid.

The primary objection in the first part of his critique is that Einstein's concept of simultaneity, while seemingly not depending on Newtonian time, nevertheless presupposes it:

Both in the Special and the General Theory the characterization of the movement of our system of reference K′ in relation to another presupposes a time concept valid for the whole of space.
Since Einstein rejects classical a priori universal and uniform time, his first task is to create a new time concept, and this he undertakes to do with the aid of the light-ray regulation of clocks. This however, presupposes time relation between distant points in order to identify them and through his reasonings Einstein unconsciously presupposes time in the classical sense.
...
The result is that Einstein's Theory of Relativity is based on the indiscriminate use of the word time in two different meanings which makes his Theory untenable from a logical point of view.

— page 120 of Relativity, Time and Reality

Nordenson was elected a member of the Royal Swedish Academy of Engineering Sciences in 1930 and of the Royal Swedish Academy of Sciences in 1948.

=== Industry and politics ===
While Nordenson was still active in Uppsala, he also started to work in industry. His background in chemistry and his mother's family's business interests in candle manufacturer Liljeholmens Stearinfabriks AB led him to this company, where he was technical director from 1917, CEO from 1929 to 1950, and chairman from 1950 to 1963. He was also active in several other companies in the Swedish chemical industry as well as a chairman or board member in several different industrial, political and cultural boards.

Nordenson was active in The Rightist Party, and when Gösta Bagge became chairman in 1935, Nordenson was one of those who was often asked for advice. He was one of this party's member of the upper house of the Parliament of Sweden from 1938 to 1953.

== Awards and decorations ==
- (Sweden) Commander Grand Cross of the Order of the Polar Star (6 June 1957)

== Selected publications ==
- Relativity, Time and Reality (Allen & Unwin, 1969)
