= Dorothy Jordan =

Dorothy Jordan may refer to:

- Dorothea Jordan (sometimes called Dorothy or Dora, née Bland, 1761–1816), Anglo-Irish actress, courtesan, and mistress and companion of the future King William IV of the United Kingdom
- Dorothy Jordan (film actress) (1906–1988), American film actress

== See also ==
- Dorothy Jordan Lloyd (1890–1946), British scientist
