= Carl-Erik Sjöstedt =

Swedish mathematician, teacher, and philosopher

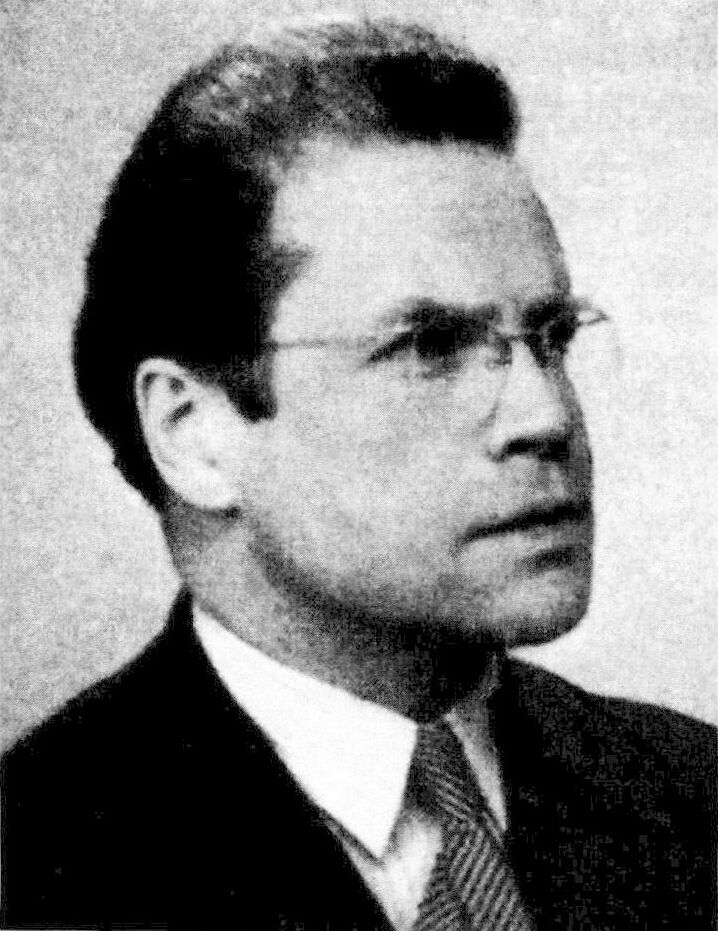
- Born: 31 July 1900; Eskilstuna, Södermanland, Sweden
- Died: 8 February 1979 (aged 78)
- Education: Uppsala University

Carl-Erik Sjöstedt (born 1900, died 1979) was a Swedish mathematician, teacher, and philosopher. Sjöstedt focused much of his work on the teaching of mathematics in the Swedish curriculum, especially in the fields of geometry and logic. Sjöstedt was a follower of the Swedish philosopher Adolf Phalén, and a supporter of Uppsala philosophy. He also was a speaker and author in the constructed language Interlingue, founding a national association for the language in 1928.

== Life ==
=== Early life and education ===
Sjöstedt was born on 31 July 1900 to foreman Karl August Sjöstedt and Matilda Åström in Eskilstuna parish, Södermanland County, Sweden. He began his education in the city, graduating in 1919. Sjöstedt would complete the rest of his education at Uppsala University, gaining a Bachelor of Arts (Swedish: filosofie kandidat) in 1921, a licentiate in 1927, and becoming a Doctor of Philosophy in 1930. His thesis for the latter was defended in 1929 and was on the subject of geometry.

During his research, Sjöstedt met philosopher Adolf Phalén, who would remain a friend of Sjöstedt's and influence his philosophical theories; Sjöstedt presented Phalén with a dissertation on the epistemology of geometry, which would be factored into a memorial to him in 1937. During the 1930s, Phalén, along with a group of other philosophers including Sjöstedt held private meetings to discuss the place of philosophy as a subject within the education system of Sweden. After Phalén's death, Sjöstedt collected much of Phalén's unfinished and unpublished work, mainly concerning the history of the theory of knowledge, and published it under the title Mindre Arbeten (Minor Works). Throughout his life, like Phalén, Sjöstedt was a proponent of Uppsalafilosofin (Uppsala philosophy), countering opposing philosophies such as those of Hans Larsson.

=== Career ===
Sjöstedt worked as a teacher for much of his career, teaching at various private school until 1931, before lecturing in mathematics at the Jämtlands Gymnasium Wargentin (then the Högre allmänna läroverket i Östersund; Higher General Education Agency in Östersund). In 1939, Sjöstedt acted as headmaster at the Läroverk (form of Swedish secondary school, similar to a gymnasium) in Borås, Västergötland. After this, Sjöstedt was Undervisningsråd (counsel of pedagogy) of the Skolöverstyrelsen (former Swedish Board of Education) from 1940 until 1962.

Sjöstedt was an opponent of the 1950s movement to introduce comprehensive schools, calling the movement "an educational utopia of colossal proportions"; his opposition was successful, as the 1962 Education Act replaced Sweden's previous schooling system which he had supported. Sjöstedt later lead an inquiry into the role of vocational schools, supporting them as a default, as opposed to Upper Secondary Schools, but later resigned from the position.

=== Personal life ===
Aside from work in pedagogy and mathematics, Sjöstedt was a supporter of the international auxiliary language Interlingue (then known as Occidental), created by the Estonian Edgar de Wahl. Founding the Sved Occidental-Federation (Swedish Occidental-Federation) in 1928, Sjöstedt published several books in the language throughout his life. Sjöstedt published many articles in the organisation's magazine, Li Sved Occidentalist (The Swedish Occidentalist), as well as the magazine Cosmoglotta.

Sjöstedt married Svea Augusta Malmberg on 7 July 1927, and died on 8 February 1979 in the parish of Uppsala Cathedral, Uppsala County, aged 78.

== Works ==
Sjöstedt wrote several textbooks about geometry, publishing courses for high schools in 1936 and 1938, as well as a series of other textbooks through the 1950s. Sjöstedt also wrote for the Swedish journal Natur & Kultur from 1947. Aside from these, Sjöstedt also published several books about geometry theory and philosophy, including De filosofiska problemens historia (The history of philosophical problems) in 1936, for use in teaching high school philosophy, alongside Översikt av den formella logiken (An overview of formal logic). Other works included:

- Occidental - de internatuinella ordens språk, 1928
- Dubbel Occidental-Ordbok, 1930 (in Occidental, Swedish)
- Projektiv geometri, 1932, second edition published 1947
- Geometriens axiomsystem, 1937
- Zur Erkenntnistheorie der Geometrie, 1937 (in German)
- Icke-euklidisk geometri, 1945
- Filosofisk läsebok, 1950
- Le Axiome de Paralleles de Euclides a Hilbert, a mathematical encyclopaedia of around 1000 pages; 1968 (in Occidental)
- Vocabularie mathematic in interlingue: Con traduction in angles, frances e german, 1970; published in Natur och Kultur. (in Occidental, English, French, and German)
