= Otto C. Glaser =

American zoologist

Otto Charles Glaser (October 13, 1880 – 1951) was an American zoologist.

== Biography ==
He was born in Wiesbaden, Germany. His parents were of French and German descent, and he came with them to the United States while very young. He got his early education in private schools in Baltimore, and then spent two years in Baltimore City College (1894-1896). In 1900 he received a Bachelor of Arts degree from Johns Hopkins University. He stayed there to do graduate work, and in 1904 received the degree of Doctor of Philosophy His doctoral thesis was "The Larva of Fasciolaria tulipa (var. distans)".

In 1901–1902 he was assistant in the United States Bureau of Fisheries and in the North Carolina Geological Survey. In 1903 he was marine biologist of the Gulf Biological Station and from 1905 to 1907 taught biology at Woods Hole, Massachusetts, during the summers. In 1905, he began teaching zoology at the University of Michigan, becoming in 1908 assistant professor of biology. In 1916 he moved to Amherst College, where he served as Professor of Biology until 1948.

Glaser had two children with his first wife Dorothy Gibbs Merrylees whom he married in 1909 and divorced in 1933. He remarried in May 1934, but his second wife, Anita Gibson, born in 1880, and the daughter of Read Admiral William C. Gibson, died of cancer in 1940. In 1941 he married the biomathematician Dorothy Wrinch. In 1944 Glaser was forced to resign as chairman because he had allowed his research assistant, who was supported with Rockefeller Foundation money, to spend time working for Wrinch. Glaser was not allowed any more research funding and retired in 1948. He died of kidney disease and diabetes in 1951.

== Publications ==
1. Über den kannibalismus bei Fasciolaria tulipa (var. distans) und deren larvale excretionsorgane. 1904. Johns Hopkins PhD thesis.
2. Collected reprints, 1924
