= Carl Niemann =

American biochemist

Carl George Niemann (July 6, 1908 – April 29, 1964) was an American biochemist who worked extensively on the chemistry and structure of proteins, publishing over 260 research papers. He is known, with Max Bergmann, for proposing the Bergmann-Niemann hypothesis that proteins consist of 288 residue polypeptides or multiples thereof with periodic sequences of amino acids, and for contributing to the downfall of the cyclol model of protein structure.

Niemann was born in St. Louis and attended the University of Wisconsin–Madison. After completing his Ph.D. in biochemistry there in 1934 and staying on as research associate until 1935, Niemann took a position at the Rockefeller Institute for Medical Research, where he worked with the eminent protein chemist Max Bergmann. Niemann analyzed the amino acid content of range of proteins. Based on Niemann's tests and other published protein analyses, Bergmann and Niemann deduced that the sizes of protein molecules are always multiples of 288 and could be expressed according to the formula 2^{n} X 3^{m}. They also suggested that in the polypeptides of a given protein, amino acids occurred in a regular, repeating pattern; for example, they proposed that silk fibroin, known to consist mainly of glycine and alanine, had a sequence of glycine-alanine-glycine-[other], with the glycine/alanine pattern making up three of every four amino acids and other residues falling periodically into the fourth spot. Niemann worked with Bergmann on this theory from 1936 to 1938; by 1939, they came to reject the theory as other biochemists provided evidence contradicting their proposed formula.

After his work at the Rockefeller Institute and at the University College Hospital as a Rockefeller Foundation Fellow, and with strong support from Warren Weaver, Niemann joined Linus Pauling's Crellin Laboratory at Caltech in 1938. In 1939, Niemann and Linus Pauling published a strong critique of Dorothy Wrinch's cyclol hypothesis of protein structure, which held that globular proteins formed inter-linked, cage-like polyhedral structures. Niemann and Pauling argued that X-ray crystallography and other data indicated that cyclol bonds did not occur in proteins and that polypeptides were held together in globular proteins by hydrogen bonds and weaker intermolecular forces. He went on to head research in immunochemistry and the organic chemistry of proteins.

In 1945, Niemann became of full professor at Caltech. He was elected to the National Academy of Sciences in 1952, and was also elected to the American Academy of Arts and Sciences and the New York Academy of Sciences. He died of a heart attack, according to his eulogizer John D. Roberts, "at the very height of his career".
