= Adolf Phalén =

Swedish philosopher

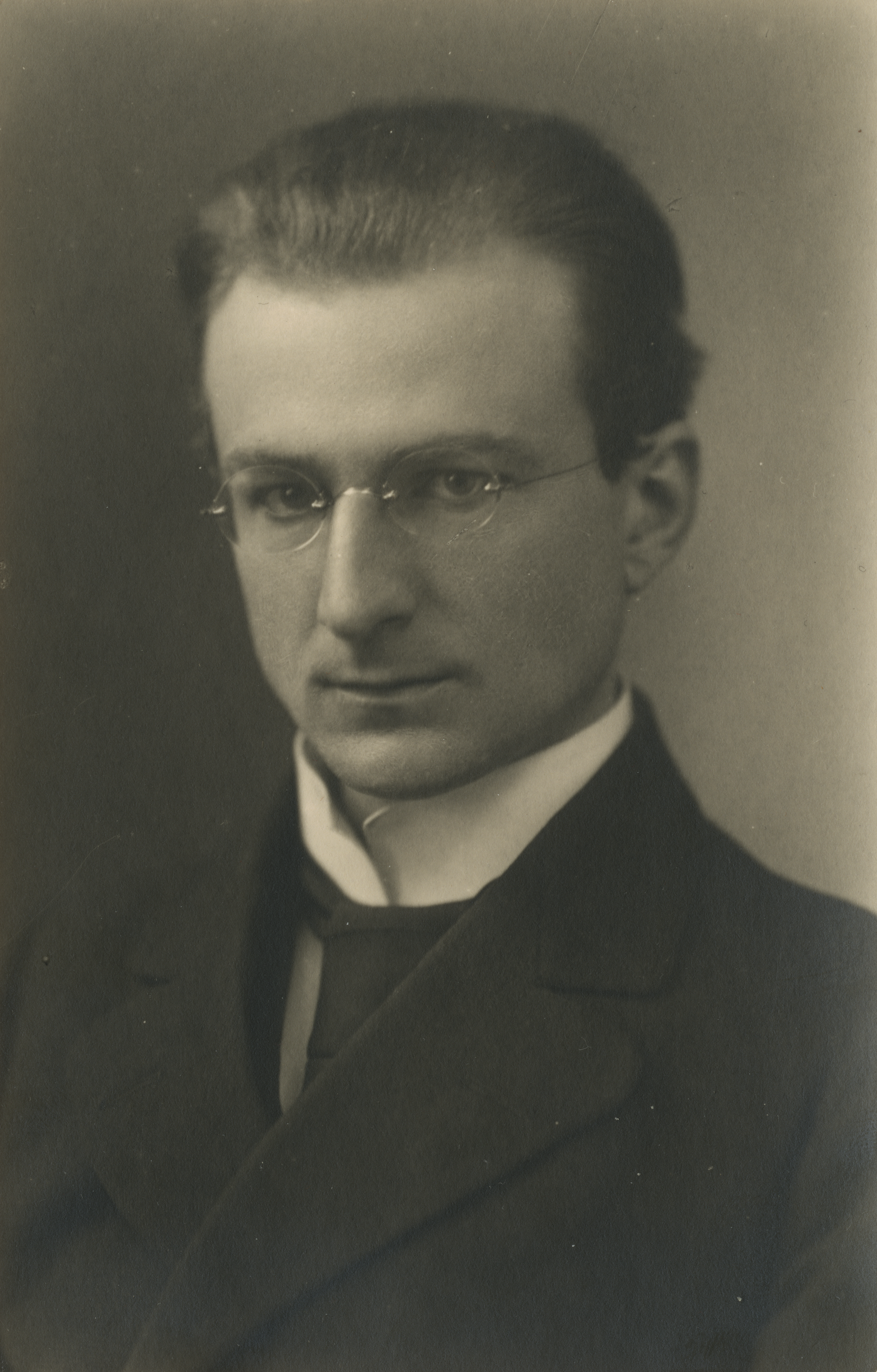
- Born: Adolf Krister Hermansson Phalén; 19 January 1884; Kalmar County, Sweden
- Died: 16 October 1931 (aged 47); Uppsala, Sweden

Philosophical work
- Institutions: Uppsala University
- Main interests: Epistemology, theoretical philosophy, philosophy of space and time
- Notable works: Beitrag zur Klärung des Begriffs der inneren Erfahrung (1913); Ueber die Relativität der Raum- und Zeit-bestimmungen (1922)

Adolf Krister Hermansson Phalén, born 19 January 1884 in Tuna, Kalmar County, died 16 October 1931 in Uppsala, was a Swedish philosopher.

== Biography ==
Phalén entered Uppsala University in 1902 where he intended to study law. However, after passing the preparatory examination for law students in 1903, he switch to philosophy instead. He took a bachelor's degree in 1907 and a licentiate degree in 1910, studying for professor Karl Reinhold Geijer. He became a Ph.D. in 1912, after having written a thesis on Hegelian philosophy. Phalén became acting professor in theoretical philosophy in Uppsala from 1914, following Geijer's retirement, and professor from 1916.

In his younger days as a philosopher, Phalén was strongly influenced by Axel Hägerström, also active in Uppsala, which meant an active study of Immanuel Kant's philosophy and post-Kantian transcendental idealism. Hägerström and Phalén were the leading names in the Uppsala school of philosophy focused on analysis of concepts, and which came to prominence in the 1920s and 1930s.

Phaléns 1913 book, Beitrag zur Klärung des Begriffs der inneren Erfahrung, a work in epistemology, is usually considered his most important contribution.

His 1922 book Ueber die Relativität der Raum- und Zeit-bestimmungen discusses the concepts of space, time and movement, as well as epistemological questions about the foundations of geometry and the concepts of infinity and quantity. Phaléns criticism of Albert Einstein's theory of relativity in this book has been controversial. Phalén aims to differentiate between a philosophical and a physical part of Einstein's theories and only discusses the philosophical part. In 1937, physicist and philosopher Philipp Frank published a thorough counter-criticism to Phalén's writings in this field.

Phalén's student Harald Nordenson published a licentiate thesis in Swedish on Einstein's theories in 1922, which he later developed into his 1969 English book, Relativity, Time and Reality.
