= Dorothy Jordan Lloyd =

British biochemist

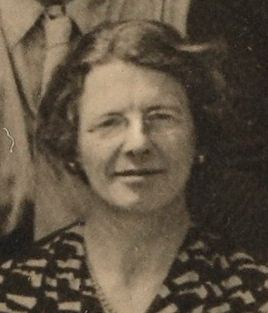
- Lloyd in 1933
- Born: 1 May 1889; Birmingham, England, UK
- Died: 21 November 1946 (aged 57); Great Bookham, Surrey, England, UK
- Occupation: Scientist

Dorothy Jordan Lloyd (1 May 1889 – 21 November 1946) was an early protein scientist who studied the interactions of water with proteins, particularly gelatin. She was also Director of the British Leather Manufacturers' Research Association. She was the first to propose that the structure of globular proteins was maintained by hydrogen bonds, an idea championed later by Linus Pauling and others.

== Early life ==
She was one of four children, and was born in Birmingham. Her father was George Jordan Lloyd, a surgeon who later became later professor of surgery at the University of Birmingham. Her mother was Marian Hampson Simpson. She went to school at King Edward VI High School for Girls in Birmingham and, in 1908, went on to university at Newnham College, Cambridge. There, in 1910, she was placed in the first class in part one of the natural sciences tripos as well as in part two (zoology) in 1912. She was a Bathurst student, and became the third Newnham fellow (1914–21).

She worked at Cambridge on issues surrounding osmotic phenomena and regeneration of muscle tissue. She subsequently studied osmotic phenomena in simpler, non-living colloidal systems. The First World War interrupted this research, but was asked by the Medical Research Committee to investigate alternative media for the culturing of bacteria, as well as what causes ropiness in bread (i.e. bacterial spoilage and fruity odours in freshly-cooked loaves), and how this can be avoided.

== Research and later life ==
In 1921, R. H. Pickard invited Lloyd to work at the recently formed British Leather Manufacturers' Research Association. There she was able to continued her basic research (especially how protein fibres behaved in aqueous systems), but also quickly came to understand the processes involved in the leather manufacturing industry, and was able to develop and introduce a number of control mechanisms which have since become normal tannery practice. She succeeded Pickard in the position of director in 1927 and was, until her death in 1946, the only woman leading such an industrial research organisation. Despite many set-backs over that time (such as the wartime bombing of their new laboratory facilities) support for the BLMRA's work increased under her leadership, and it came to be seen as an essential part of the leather manufacturing industry.

Dorothy Jordan Lloyd served on committees and boards of numerous societies, including the International Society of Leather Trades' Chemists. She received the Fraser Muir Moffat medal, awarded by the Tanners' Council of America in 1939 for her contributions to leather chemistry. From 1943 to 1946 she served as vice-president of the Royal Institute of Chemistry, and was also and a member of the Chemical Council.

Besides many contributions to scientific journals, Dorothy Jordan Lloyd was the author of The Chemistry of the Proteins (1926; 2nd edn, with Agnes Shore, 1938), and planned and contributed to Progress in Leather Science, 1920–45 (3 vols., 1946–48), which became one of the world's foremost textbooks on leather technology.

== Personal life ==
A keen mountaineer in later life, in 1928 Dorothy Jordan Lloyd was noted for making the first ascent and descent in one day of the Eiger's Mittellegi Ridge. She was never married, and died at Kenilworth Lodge, Great Bookham, Surrey, on 21 November 1946, aged 57.

== Works ==
- Jordan Lloyd, D (1932). "Colloidal Structure and its Biological Significance". Biological Reviews. 7 (3): 254–273. doi:10.1111/j.1469-185x.1962.tb01043.x. S2CID 84286671.
- Jordan Lloyd, D; Marriott (1933). "The swelling of protein fibres. Part II. Silk gut". Transactions of the Faraday Society. 29 (140): 1228. doi:10.1039/tf9332901228.
