= Mortimer Louis Anson =

American biochemist (1901–1968)

- Born: 1901
- Died: October 16, 1968
- Known for: Two-state model of protein folding
- Spouse: Nina Anton
- Children: At least one daughter, Jill (Mrs. John Szarkowski)
- Scientific career
- Fields: Protein chemistry
- Institutions: Rockefeller Institute

Mortimer (Tim) Louis Anson (1901 – 16 October 1968) was the protein chemist who proposed that protein folding was a reversible, two-state reaction. He was the founding editor of Advances in Protein Chemistry.

== Protein folding studies ==
Together with Alfred Mirsky, Anson was the first to propose that conformational protein folding was a reversible process. He later proposed that it was essentially a two-state process, i.e., that the folded and unfolded states were well-defined thermodynamic states separated by a large activation energy barrier. He also was the first to note that the energy barrier typical of folding (5 kcal/mol, 20 kJ/lmol) was small compared to the absolute magnitudes of the energies and entropies involved (~100 kcal/mol, 400 kJ/mol) and, hence, proposed that energy and entropy were continuously traded off during the folding process.

Anson moved to the Rockefeller Institute in 1927, where he remained for fifteen years (1927–1942). He worked closely with John H. Northrop. In 1937, Anson first purified and crystallized carboxypeptidase A, a classic model system of protein science.

== Advances in Protein Chemistry ==
In 1944 Anson was, with J. T. Edsall, the founding editor of Advances in Protein Chemistry, which remains one of the leading journals for reviewing the state of biochemical problems. Anson conceived the journal in long discussions with Kurt Jacoby, who had fled Nazi Germany and had once headed the Akademische Verlagsgesellschaft in Leipzig.

== Nutritional research ==
Anson was haunted by the suffering caused in the underdeveloped world by poor nutrition, and in 1942, left a prestigious research position at the Rockefeller Institute to investigate biochemical and genetic methods for improving the nutrition of foods, e.g., amino acid fortification.

== Personal history ==
In 1945, Tim Anson married Nina Anton, who was active in the theater. Together, they had at least one daughter, Jill (Mrs. John Szarkowski). Nina Anson died of a heart attack in October 1963. Tim Anson died on 1 October 1968 of his third heart attack (the first two having been in early 1966 and the summer of 1968).

Anson was good friends with Béla Bartók, especially during Bartók's final years in America.
