= Analytical ultracentrifugation =

Analytical ultracentrifugation is an analytical technique which combines an ultracentrifuge with optical monitoring systems.

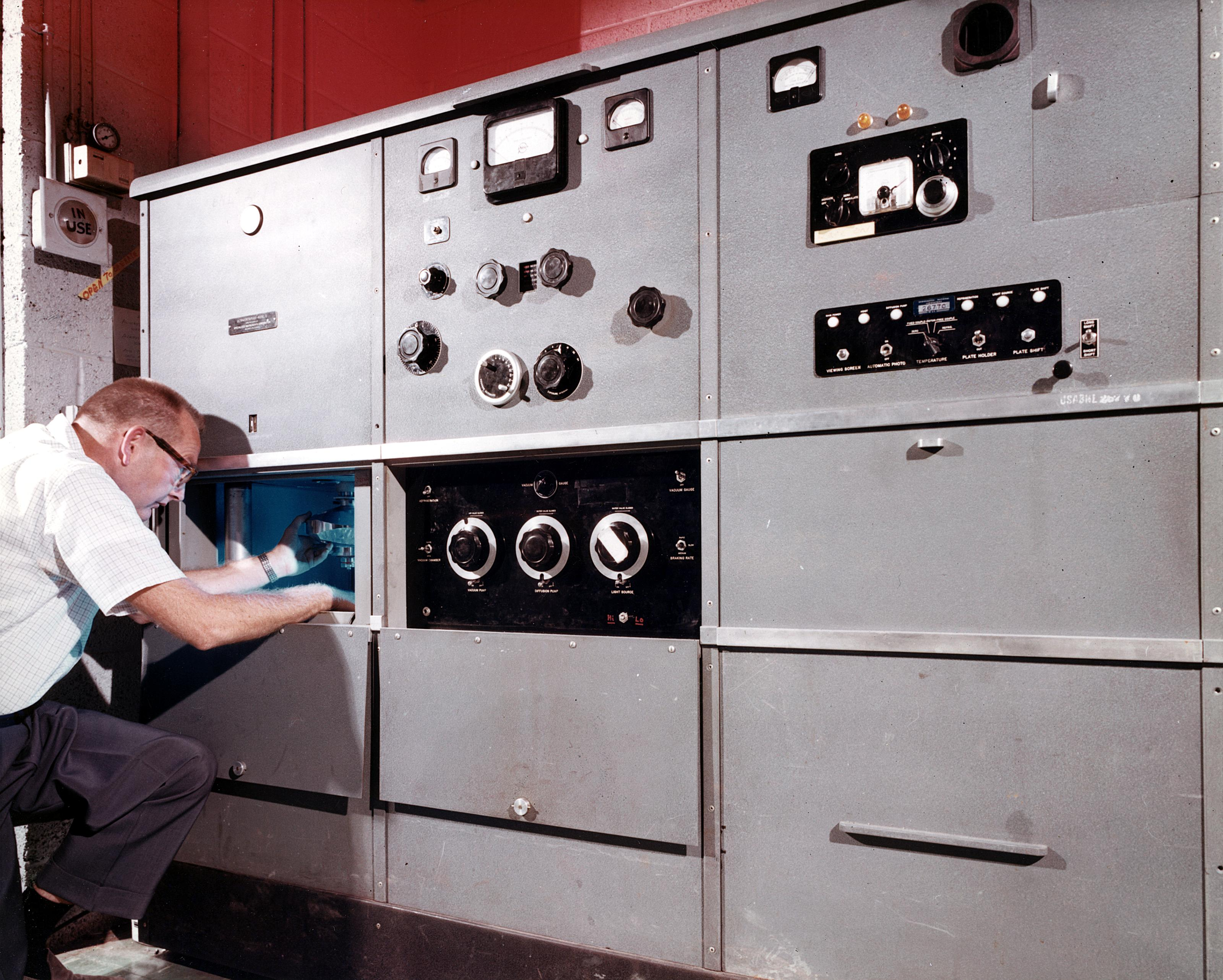
Spinco Model E Analytical Ultracentrifuge. This is an early instrument, dating to the 1950s. The operator is seated in front of the sample chamber, with his left hand touching the rotor. In operation, the chamber would be sealed behind an armored shroud and pumped down to vacuum. The shroud has been lowered to allow access for loading or unloading the rotor.

In an analytical ultracentrifuge (commonly abbreviated as AUC), a sample’s sedimentation profile is monitored in real time by an optical detection system. The sample is detected via ultraviolet light absorption and/or interference optical refractive index sensitive system, monitored by light-sensitive diode array or by film in the older machines. The operator can thus observe the change of sample concentration versus the axis of the rotation profile with time as a result of the applied centrifugal field. With modern instrumentation, these observations are electronically digitized and stored for further mathematical analysis.

The information that can be obtained from an analytical ultracentrifuge includes the gross shape of macromolecules, conformational changes in macromolecules, and size distributions of macromolecules. With AUC it is possible to gain information on the number and subunit stoichiometry of non-covalent complexes and equilibrium constants of macromolecules such as proteins, DNA, nanoparticles or other assemblies from different molecule classes. The simplest measurement to be obtained is the sedimentation coefficient, which depends upon the size of the molecules being sedimented. This is the ratio of a particle's sedimentation velocity to the applied acceleration causing the sedimentation.

Analytical ultracentrifugation has recently seen a rise in use because of increased ease of analysis with modern computers and the development of software, including a National Institutes of Health supported software package, SedFit.

== Instrumentation ==
Rotors for an Analytical Ultracentrifuge for a maximal spinning velocity of 50,000 (left) and 60,000 (right) rpm

An analytical ultracentrifuge has a light source and optical detectors. To allow the light to pass through the analyte during the ultracentrifuge run, specialized cells are required which have to meet high optical standards as well as to resist the centrifugal forces. Each cell consists of a housing, two windows made from optically pure quartz glass, and a centrepiece with one or two sectors and filling holes for the sector(s), closed with a screw plug in the housing. These cell are placed into a rotor cavity with a continuous bore, with a collar at the bottom to retain the cell.

== Types of experiments ==
By applying specific equipment and adapting measurement parameters several types of experiments can be performed. Most common AUC experiments are sedimentation velocity and sedimentation equilibrium experiments.

=== Sedimentation velocity ===
Sedimentation velocity experiments render the shape and molar mass of the analytes, as well as their size-distribution. The size resolution of this method scales approximately with the square of the particle radii, and by adjusting the rotor speed of the experiment size-ranges from 100 Da to 10 GDa can be covered. Sedimentation velocity experiments can also be used to study reversible chemical equilibria between macromolecular species, by either monitoring the number and molar mass of macromolecular complexes, by gaining information about the complex composition from multi-signal analysis exploiting differences in each components spectroscopic signal, or by following the composition dependence of the sedimentation rates of the macromolecular system, as described in Gilbert-Jenkins theory.

The experiment aims to monitor the sedimentation behavior at a fixed angular speed.

=== Sedimentation equilibrium ===
Sedimentation equilibrium experiments reports the molar mass of analytes and their chemical equilibrium constants. The rotor speed is adjusted such that a steady-state concentration profile c(r) of the sample in the cell is formed, where sedimentation and diffusion cancel out each other.

== See also ==
- Ultracentrifuge
- Gas centrifuge
- Theodor Svedberg
- Differential centrifugation
- Buoyant density ultracentrifugation
- Zippe-type centrifuge
