= Theodor Svedberg =

Swedish chemist (1884–1971)

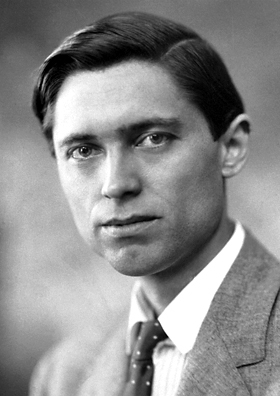
- Svedberg in 1926
- Born: Theodor Svedberg; 30 August 1884; Valbo, Sweden
- Died: 25 February 1971 (aged 86); Kopparberg, Sweden
- Education: Uppsala University
- Known for: Analytical ultracentrifugation Colloid chemistry
- Awards: Nobel Prize for Chemistry (1926); Franklin Medal (1949); Foreign Member of the Royal Society (1944); Björkénska priset (1913, 1923, 1926)
- Scientific career
- Fields: Biochemistry
- Workplaces: Uppsala University; Gustaf Werner Institute
- Doctoral students: Arne Tiselius

Theodor Svedberg (30 August 1884 – 25 February 1971) was a Swedish chemist and Nobel laureate for his research on colloids and proteins using the ultracentrifuge. Svedberg was active at Uppsala University from the mid-1900s to late 1940s. While at Uppsala, Svedberg started as a docent before becoming the university's physical chemistry head in 1912. After leaving Uppsala in 1949, Svedberg was in charge of the Gustaf Werner Institute until 1967. Apart from his 1926 Nobel Prize, Svedberg was named a Foreign Member of the Royal Society in 1944 and became part of the National Academy of Sciences in 1945.

== Early life and education ==
Svedberg was born in Valbo, Sweden on 30 August 1884. He was the son of Augusta Alstermark and Elias Svedberg. Growing up, Svedberg enjoyed botany and other branches of science. While in grammar school, Svedberg conducted individual laboratorial research and performed scientific demonstrations. For his post-secondary education, Svedberg entered a chemistry program at Uppsala University in the early mid 1900s. He earned his Bachelor of Arts degree in 1905, his master's degree in 1907, and in 1908, he earned his Ph.D.

== Career ==
While at Uppsala, Svedberg started his scientific career in 1905 as an assistant chemist with the university. After becoming a chemistry docent for Uppsala in 1907, he became the university's physical chemistry head in 1912. For his academic tenure, Svedberg remained with Uppsala until 1949. During the early 1920s, he also temporarily taught for the University of Wisconsin. After leaving Uppsala, Svedberg led the Gustaf Werner Institute from 1949 to 1967.

== Research ==
Svedberg's work with colloids supported the theories of Brownian motion put forward by Albert Einstein and the Polish physicist Marian Smoluchowski. During this work, he developed the technique of analytical ultracentrifugation, and demonstrated its utility in distinguishing pure proteins one from another.

== Awards and honours ==
The unit svedberg (symbol S), a unit of time amounting to 10^{−13} s or 100 fs, is named after him, as well as The Svedberg Laboratory in Uppsala.

Svedberg's candidacy for the Royal Society reads:

"distinguished for his work in physical and colloid chemistry and the development of the ultracentrifuge"

Svedberg was elected an International Member of the American Philosophical Society in 1941. After becoming a Foreign Member of the Royal Society in 1944, Svedberg was named to the National Academy of Sciences in 1945. He was elected to the American Philosophical Society in 1948. From the 1910s to 1920s, Svedberg was awarded the Björkénska priset three times from Uppsala University for his contributions to science in Sweden. From the Franklin Institute, Svedberg was given the Franklin Medal in 1949 for his work with the ultracentrifuge.

== Death and personal life ==
On 25 February 1971, Svedberg died in Kopparberg, Sweden. He was married four times and had a total of twelve children.His widow died in 2019. He was a Lutheran
