= Dorothy Maud Wrinch =

Mathematician and biochemical theorist

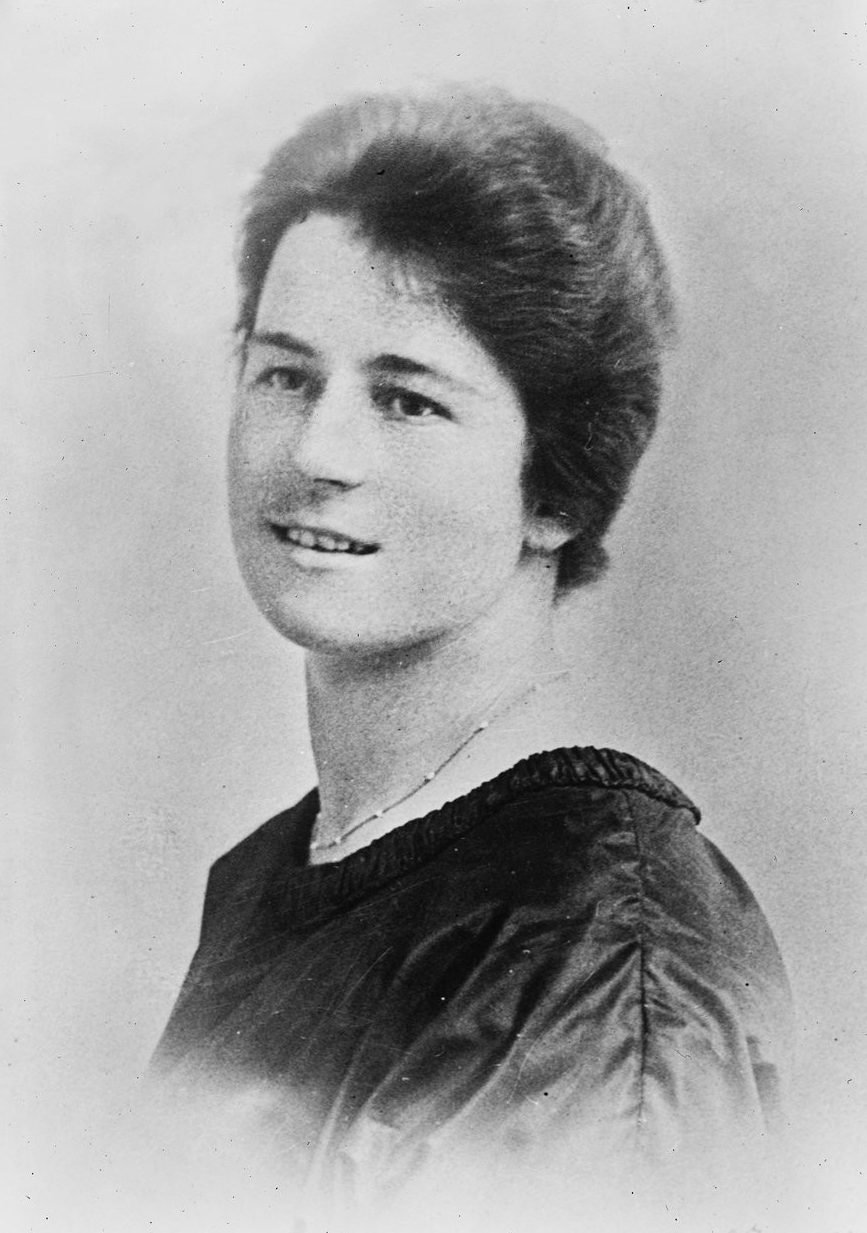
- in 1921
- Born: 12 September 1894; Rosario, Argentina
- Died: 11 February 1976 (aged 81); Falmouth, Massachusetts, US
- Education: Girton College, Cambridge; King's College London
- Occupation: Mathematician
- Employer: University College London
- Known for: Attempting to deduce protein structure using mathematical principles
- Spouse(s): John William Nicholson; Otto Glaser

Dorothy Maud Wrinch (married names Nicholson, Glaser; 12 September 1894 – 11 February 1976) was a mathematician and biochemical theorist best known for her attempt to deduce protein structure using mathematical principles. She was a champion of the controversial 'cyclol' hypothesis for the structure of proteins.

== Early life and career ==
Dorothy Wrinch was born in Rosario, Argentina, the daughter of Hugh Edward Hart Wrinch, an engineer, and Ada Souter. The family returned to England and Dorothy grew up in Surbiton, near London.

She attended Surbiton High School and in 1913 entered Girton College, Cambridge to read mathematics. Wrinch often attended meetings of the Heretics Club run by Charles Kay Ogden, and it was through a 1914 lecture organised by Ogden that she first heard Bertrand Russell speak. She graduated in 1916 as a wrangler.

For the academic year 1916–1917, Wrinch took the Cambridge Moral Sciences tripos and studied mathematical logic with Russell in London. In December she was invited to Garsington Manor, the home of Russell's then mistress Ottoline Morell, and there encountered Clive Bell and other Bloomsbury Group members, and in 1917 she introduced Russell to Dora Black who would later become his second wife. From 1917 Wrinch was funded by Girton College as a research student, officially supervised by G. H. Hardy in Cambridge but in practice by Russell in London. When, in May 1918, Russell was imprisoned for his anti-war activities, Wrinch assisted with his writing projects by bringing him books and articles.

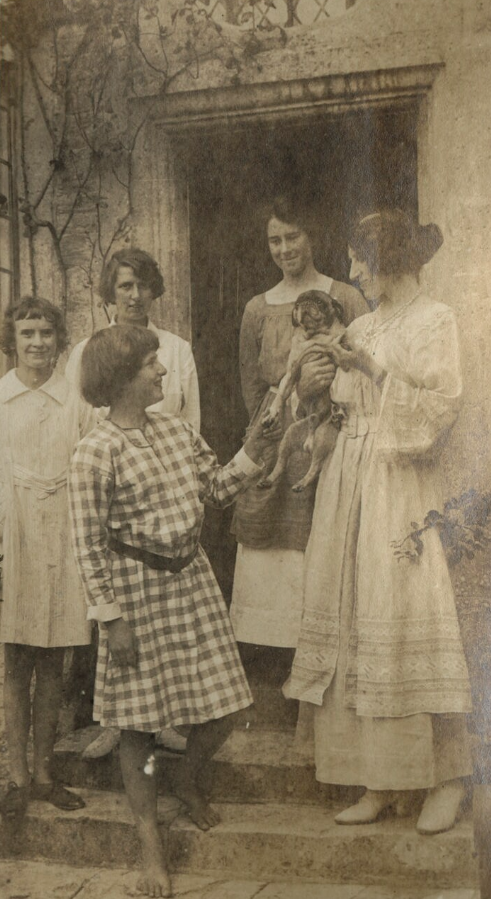
1918: Unknown girl on left, Dorothy Brett is behind Julian Vinogradoff in foreground. Dorothy Maud Wrinch in doorway and Lady Ottoline Morrell on the right

Wrinch secured the first publication of Ludwig Wittgenstein's (not yet so named) Tractatus in a German philosophical journal in 1921.

In London Wrinch attended the Aristotelian Society, including a debate between D'Arcy Thompson and John Scott Haldane on the nature of physics, biology and psychology, and she became a friend of Thompson. Wrinch spoke to the Society herself on the 'summation of pleasures', and through the Society she encountered Harold Jeffreys and Raphael Demos. In the autumn of 1918 Wrinch registered for graduate study on asymptotic expansions with the applied mathematician John Nicholson at King's College London, started to teach at University College London, and continued to work with Jeffreys on the philosophy of scientific method. She moved into a flat in Mecklenburgh Square owned by Russell's then mistress Colette O'Neil. In 1920 Girton awarded Wrinch a four-year Yarrow Research Fellowship with the freedom to work on any area of her choice. In 1920 she was awarded an MSc and in 1921 a DSc by the University of London. Wrinch moved to Oxford in 1922 upon her marriage, where she held a succession of research fellowships and lectureships or tutorships at the Oxford women's colleges for the next 16 years. She was Lady Carlisle Research Fellow at Somerville College, Oxford and first woman lecturer in mathematics at the university. In 1929 she was the first woman to receive an Oxford DSc.

Wrinch's first paper was a 1917 defence of Russell's philosophy, and between 1918 and 1932 she published 20 papers on pure and applied mathematics and 16 on scientific methodology and on the philosophy of science. At the 1928 International Congress of Mathematics in Bologna she delivered the paper "On a method for constructing harmonics for surfaces of revolution." She also presented on "Harmonics Associated with Certain Inverted Spheroids" at the 1932 ICM in Zürich." The papers she wrote with Harold Jeffreys on scientific method formed the basis of his 1931 book Scientific Inference. In the Nature obituary Jeffreys wrote, "I should like to put on record my appreciation of the substantial contribution she made to [our joint] work, which is the basis of all my later work on scientific inference."

From about 1932 Wrinch shifted towards theoretical biology. She was one of founders of the Biotheoretical Gathering (aka the 'Theoretical Biology Club'), an inter-disciplinary group that sought to explain life by discovering how proteins work. Also involved were Joseph Henry Woodger, Joseph and Dorothy Needham, C. H. Waddington, J. D. Bernal, Karl Popper and Dorothy Crowfoot Hodgkin. From then on Wrinch could be described as a theoretical biologist. She developed a model of protein structure, which she called the "cyclol" structure. The model generated considerable controversy and was attacked by the chemist Linus Pauling. In these debates Wrinch's lack of training in chemistry was a great weakness. By 1939, evidence had accumulated that the model was wrong but Wrinch continued working on it. However, experimental work by Irving Langmuir done in collaboration with Wrinch to validate her ideas catalysed the principle of the hydrophobic effect being the driving force for protein folding.

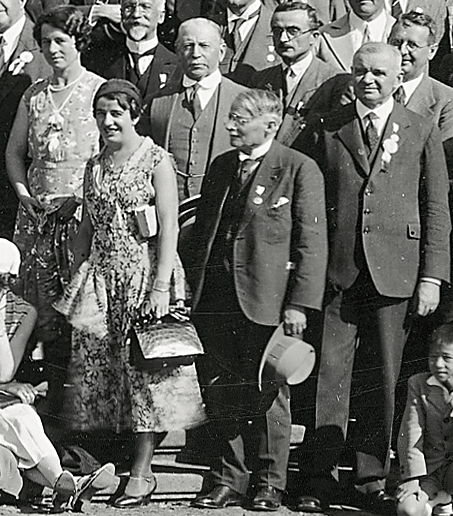
L to R: Dorothy Maud Wrinch, unknown woman in foreground), Élie Cartan (background, head truncated), Andrew Forsyth, Charles Jean de la Vallée Poussin (foreground, holding hat), Eugenio Giuseppe Togliatti (background),Rudolf Fueter, Hermann Weyl; background, partly obscured), at the 1932 International Congress of Mathematicians in Zürich

In 1936 Ida Busbridge secured a position as assistant to Wrinch from whom she took over mathematics tutorials for all five women’s colleges.

In 1939 Wrinch moved to the United States. She had a variety of teaching positions at three small Massachusetts colleges, Amherst College, Smith College, and Mount Holyoke College. From 1942 until she retired in 1971 Wrinch held research positions at Smith.

== Personal life ==
Prior to 1918 Wrinch's Cambridge University tutor G. N. Watson had proposed to her but the feeling was not mutual and she had to ask her father to explain this to Watson; nevertheless Watson later recommended Wrinch as his replacement lecturer at University College London. Around the postwar time of her intellectual closeness to Russell, Wrinch may have had a romantic connection with his brother Frank and probably did have an unhappy attachment with another of his disciples, Raphael Demos. Sources differ on whether Wrinch wanted a romantic relationship with Russell. She was for some years a close intellectual companion of Harold Jeffreys, and some contemporary observers thought them engaged. It may have been the breaking of their engagement that encouraged Jeffreys to enter psychoanalysis, which was at the time fashionable in Cambridge.

In 1922 Wrinch married her graduate supervisor at King's College London, the mathematical physicist John William Nicholson. The examination for her DSc in 1921 had, unusually, an additional referee, which may have been because of perceptions of a relationship between the two of them. Nicholson was a graduate of Owens College Manchester and also a Cambridge wrangler. In 1921 he was elected into a Fellowship at Balliol College, Oxford. The couple had one child, Pamela, born in 1927. Wrinch's book on parenthood, Retreat from Parenthood (1930), published under the pseudonym Jean Ayling and dedicated to Russell, was a venture into public health rather than a manual of child-care, propounding ideas of societal reorganisation to make child rearing more compatible with professional life. Nicholson's mental health deteriorated in the late 1920s, and in 1930 he was certified as mentally ill and confined in the Warneford Hospital until his death in 1955. In 1937 Wrinch was granted a divorce on grounds of her husband's insanity. From 1930 Wrinch was close emotionally and intellectually to the mathematician Eric Neville in a friendship which lasted until 1961.

In 1939 Wrinch and her daughter moved to the United States, partly because the chancellor of Oxford University and Foreign Secretary Lord Halifax advised her she would be most useful to the war effort by research and lecturing there. In 1941 she married Otto Charles Glaser, chairman of the biology department and vice-president of Amherst College, and it was in part through him that she was able to obtain teaching positions. In 1944 Glaser was forced to resign as chairman because he had allowed his research assistant to spend time working for Wrinch. Glaser retired in 1948 and died in 1951.

Wrinch died in Falmouth, Massachusetts on 11 February 1976.

Dorothy Hodgkin wrote in Wrinch's obituary that she was "a brilliant and controversial figure who played a part in the beginnings of much of present research in molecular biology." On a more personal level, Hodgkin wrote, "I like to think of her as she was when I first knew her, gay, enthusiastic and adventurous, courageous in face of much misfortune and very kind."

== The Retreat from Parenthood (1930) ==
Wrinch's book first summarizes the impact of having children on women’s careers, which often included termination for professional women, and the psychological and physical impact on parents and children caused by leaving to most parents practically all functions necessary to raise a child. Of special concern to her was that parents generally lack the necessary expertise in practical matters like the suitable diet and social environment best-suited for a child's development, since their professional expertise is often in other areas, and that scientifically understanding these matters requires a great deal of a parent's time (away from their career).

The book next offers a constructive solution to this problem. Wrinch proposed that there should be Child Rearing Services that assume from parents nearly every aspect of raising the child, except in four areas where a parent's involvement is absolutely crucial: "impregnation," "gestation," "childbirth," and "lactation." The Child Rearing Services (C.R.S.) would be divided into four bureaus, A, B, C, and D. The C.R.S.A. would deal with refitting homes so as to make them more comfortable and hospitable to child rearing, providing services like electrical work, plumbing services and repairs, insulation and soundproofing, and reliable hot water. The C.R.S.B. the labor of child rearing like changing diapers, preparing meals, laundry, cleaning dishes, and so on. The C.R.S.C. would deal with food safety, inspection, diet, and delivery, with a focus on ensuring that each child was well-nourished and given the best possible diet. The C.R.S.D. would deal with all medical, nursing, psychological, and other services necessary for the health and well-being of parents and child, from pregnancy to the school door.

== Selected publications ==
- "On the summation of pleasures", Proc. Aristotelian Soc. 1917-1918, 589-594. Proceedings of the Aristotelian Society.
- "On Some Aspects of the Theory of Probability," Philosophical Magazine, 38, (1919), 715–731. (with Harold Jeffreys)
- "On the Structure of Scientific Inquiry', Proceedings of the Aristotelian Society, 21, (1920–21), 181–210.
- The Retreat from Parenthood London : K. Paul, Trench, Trübner 1930 (as Jean Ayling)
- "The roots of hyper-geometric functions with a numerator and four denominators", with H.E.H. Wrinch, Phil. Mag. 1 (Ser. 7), 1926, 273–276.
- "Chromosome behaviour in terms of protein pattern", Nature 134, 1934, 978–979
- "The cyclol hypothesis and the globular proteins". Proc. Royal Society A 161, 1937, 505–524.
- Fourier transforms and structure factors; American Society for X-Ray and Electron Diffraction. 1946
- Chemical aspects of the structure of small peptides; an introduction. 1960.
- Chemical aspects of polypeptide chain structures and the cyclol theory 1965.
- List of Wrinch's publications
- "Selected papers of Dorothy Wrinch, from the Sophia Smith Collection," in "Structures of Matter and Patterns in Science, inspired by the work and life of Dorothy Wrinch, 1894–1976, The Proceedings of a Symposium held at Smith College, Northampton, Massachusetts 28–30 September 1977, Schenkman Publishing Company, 1980.
