= Tetranucleotide hypothesis =

Influential hypothesis about DNA by Phoebus Levene

Repeating tetranucleotide unit

The tetranucleotide hypothesis of Phoebus Levene proposed that DNA was composed of repeating sequences of four nucleotides. It was very influential for three decades, and was developed by Levene at least into the 1910s, and the diagram at the right illustrates the view of Levene and Tipson. In 1940, at the time of Levene's death, Bass wrote in his obituary

As a result of Levene’s work we have an exact concept of the structures of these huge molecules, probably the most complex biological materials whose architectural picture has been reconstructed.

In that form there is an implication that the four bases are present in equal amounts in DNA, and small variations in the experimental values were assumed to be the result of experimental error. "Leven considered the nucleic acids to be a regular repetitive sequence of four nucleotides. If so, they could scarcely be carriers of much information...It was not until the development of chromatographic methods that the tetranucleotide hypothesis was finally laid to rest, mainly through the work of Chargaff."

Chargaff showed that the four frequencies were not equal, with variations consistent between different studies. Specifically, according to his rules the correct relationship is G = C ≠ A = T. The equalities G = C and A = T suggested that these bases were paired, this pairing being the basis of the DNA structure that is now known to be correct. Conversely the inequalities G ≠ A etc. meant that DNA could not have a systematic repetition of a fundamental unit, as required by the tetranucleotide hypothesis. Thus there was no reason why the sequence could not store information.

In later years some authorities considered the tetranucleotide hypothesis to have been harmful to the development of molecular biology. Bentley Glass, for example, called it a "scientific catastrophe". More recently, Hargittai saw it in a more positive light, and Frixione and Ruiz-Zamarripa wrote as follows:

[Levene's] work was to culminate in Levene and Tipson’s 1935 report showing accurately for the first time the actual molecular structure of DNA, as well as a nearly correct depiction of the RNA structure. This achievement merits the distinction of this paper as a Classic in molecular biology literature.
