= Organellar DNA =

Type of DNA

Organellar DNA (oDNA) is DNA contained in organelles (such as mitochondria and chloroplasts), outside the nucleus of eukaryotic cells.

- Mitochondria contain mitochondrial DNA
- Plastids (e.g., chloroplasts) contain plastid DNA

== Inheritance of organelle DNA ==
The traits encoded by this type of DNA, in animals, generally pass from mother to offspring rather than from the father in a process called cytoplasmic inheritance. This is due to the ovum provided from the mother being larger than the male sperm cell, and therefore has more organelles, where the organellar DNA is found.

Although maternal inheritance is most common, there are also paternal and biparental patterns of inheritance that take place. The latter two patterns of inheritance are found most often in plants.

Recombination of organelle DNA is very limited, meaning that any traits that are encoded by the oDNA are likely to remain the same as they are passed from generation to generation.

== Structure ==
Unlike nuclear DNA, which is present as linear molecules inside the chromosomes, the entire genomes of chloroplasts and mitochondria are present on a single molecule of double-stranded circular DNA molecule; this is very similar structure to a bacterial chromosome.

Although the functionality and genetic structure vary significantly between different organelles and their host species, genetic characteristic patterns allow the differentiation between nucleolar and organellar DNA. A recently published machine-learning approach using only the genome sequences and multiple genome annotation tools can classify them.

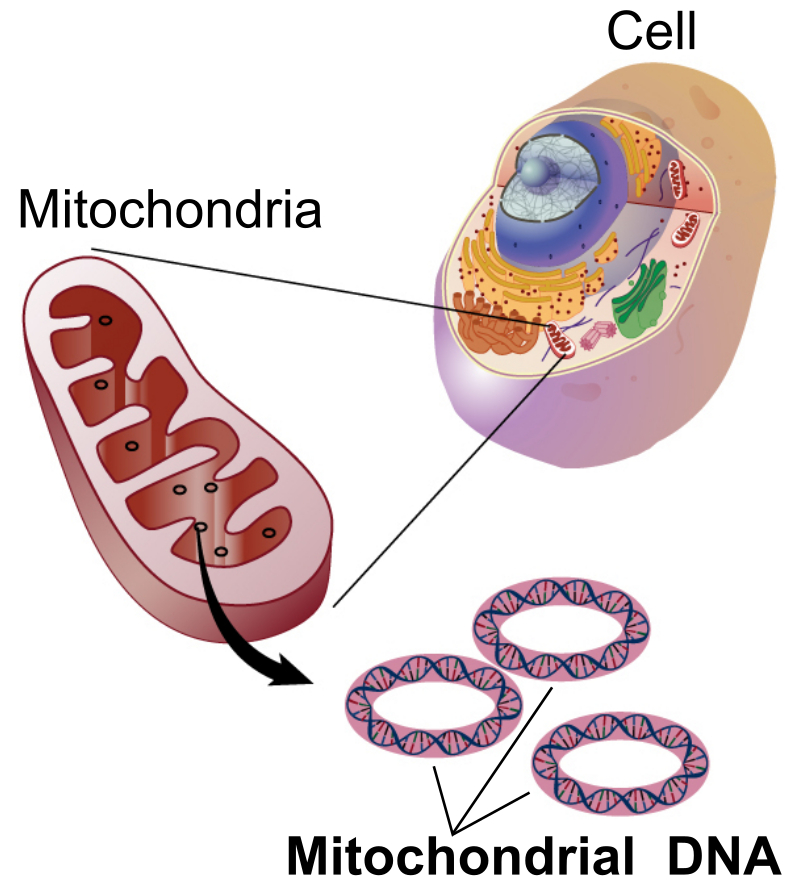
Structure and location of mitochondrial DNA

Example of genome and structure of ctDNA. This picture specifically shows the genome of a tobacco plant.

== See also ==
- Nuclear DNA
- Non-Mendelian Inheritance
