= Phoebus Levene =

American biochemist (1869–1940)

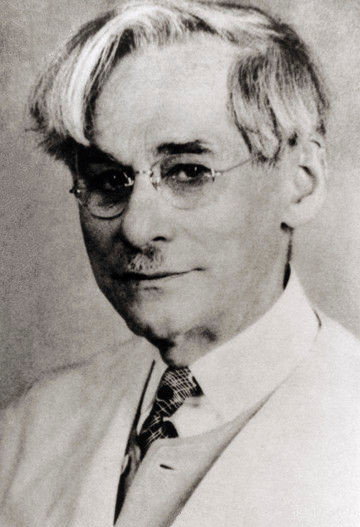
- Born: Fishel Aronovich Levin; February 25, 1869; Sagor, Russia (now Žagarė, Lithuania)
- Died: September 6, 1940 (aged 71); New York, New York
- Education: Imperial Military Medical Academy, St. Petersburg (M.D., 1891); Columbia University
- Known for: Tetranucleotide hypothesis
- Awards: Willard Gibbs Medal (1931); William H. Nichols Medal (1938)
- Scientific career
- Fields: Biochemistry; Organic Chemistry
- Workplaces: Rockefeller Institute of Medical Research
- Academic advisors: Aleksandr Dianin; Ira van Gieson; Adolf Mayer

Phoebus Aaron Theodore Levene (25 February 1869 – 6 September 1940) was a Russian-born American biochemist who studied the structure and function of nucleic acids. He characterized the different forms of nucleic acid, DNA from RNA, and found that DNA contained adenine, guanine, thymine, cytosine, deoxyribose, and a phosphate group.

He was born into a Litvak (Lithuanian Jewish) family as Fishel Aronovich Levin in the town of Žagarė in Lithuania, then part of the Russian Empire, but grew up in St. Petersburg. There he studied medicine at the Imperial Military Medical Academy (M.D., 1891) and developed an interest in biochemistry. In 1893, because of antisemitic pogroms, he and his family emigrated to the United States and he practiced medicine in New York City.

Levene enrolled at Columbia University and in his spare time conducted biochemical research, publishing papers on the chemical structure of sugars. In 1896 he was appointed as an Associate in the Pathological Institute of the New York State Hospitals, but he had to take time off to recuperate from tuberculosis. During this period, he worked with several chemists, including Albrecht Kossel and Emil Fischer, who were the experts in proteins.

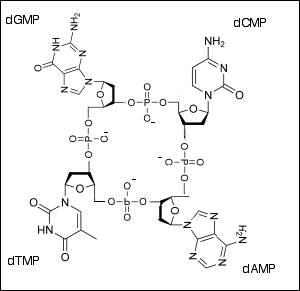
Structural formula of a proposed tetranucleotide, later shown to be incorrect. It was proposed by Phoebus Levene around 1910

In 1905, Levene was appointed as head of the biochemical laboratory at the Rockefeller Institute of Medical Research. He spent the rest of his career at this institute, and it was there that he identified the components of DNA. In 1909, Levene and Walter Jacobs recognised d-ribose as a natural product and an essential component of nucleic acids. They also recognised that the unnatural sugar that Emil Fischer and Oscar Piloty had reported in 1891 was the enantiomer of d-ribose. Levene went on to discover deoxyribose in 1929. Not only did Levene identify the components of DNA, he also showed that the components were linked together in the order phosphate-sugar-base to form units. He called each of these units a nucleotide, and stated that the DNA molecule consisted of a string of nucleotide units linked together through the phosphate groups, which are the 'backbone' of the molecule. His ideas about the structure of DNA were wrong; he thought there were only four nucleotides per molecule. He even declared that it could not store the genetic code because it was chemically far too simple. However, his work was a key basis for the later work that determined the structure of DNA. Levene published over 700 original papers and articles on biochemical structures. Levene died in 1940, before the true significance of DNA became clear.

Levene is known for his tetranucleotide hypothesis which proposed that DNA was made up of equal amounts of adenine, guanine, cytosine, and thymine. Before the later work of Erwin Chargaff, it was widely thought that DNA was organized into repeating tetranucleotides in a way that could not carry genetic information. Instead, the protein component of chromosomes was thought to be the basis of heredity; most research on the physical nature of the gene focused on proteins, and particularly enzymes and viruses, before the 1940s.

Levene was an elected member of both the United States National Academy of Sciences and the American Philosophical Society.

== General and cited references ==
- Tipson, R. Stuart (1957). "Phoebus Aaron Theodor Levene, 1869–1940". In Wolfrom, Melville (ed.). Advances in Carbohydrate Chemistry. Advances in Carbohydrate Chemistry. Vol. 12. pp. 1–12. doi:10.1016/s0096-5332(08)60202-7. ISBN 9780120072125. PMID 13617111.

References for the discovery of ribose and deoxyribose:

- P. A. Levene and L. W. Bass, Nucleic Acids, The Chemical Catalog Co., NY, 1931, pp 24 (deoxyribose) and 131 (ribose).
