= Wacław Szybalski =

Polish physician (1921–2020)

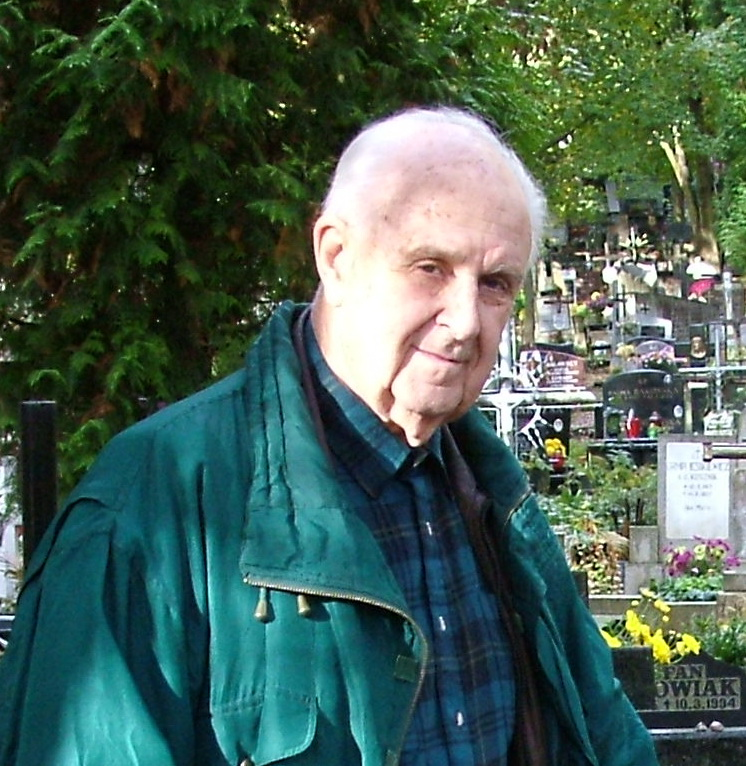
- Szybalski in 2004.
- Born: 9 September 1921; Lwów, Second Polish Republic
- Died: 16 December 2020 (aged 99); Madison, United States
- Education: Lviv Polytechnic
- Known for: Szybalski's rule
- Awards: Casimir Funk Natural Science Award (2003); Grand Cross of the Order of Polonia Restituta (2011)
- Scientific career
- Fields: Oncology genetics biotechnology
- Workplaces: McArdle Laboratory for Cancer Research; University of Wisconsin–Madison

Wacław Szybalski (Polish pronunciation: [ˈvat͡swaf ʂɨˈbalskʲi]; 9 September 1921 – 16 December 2020) was a Polish-American medical researcher, geneticist and professor of oncology at the McArdle Laboratory for Cancer Research, University of Wisconsin–Madison Medical School.

== Early life ==
Wacław Szybalski was born in September 1921 in Lwów, Poland, into a Polish intelligentsia family. His father Stefan was an engineer, and his mother, Michalina née Rakowska, was a Doctor of Chemistry. The Szybalski family maintained close friendships with numerous leading representatives of the Polish intelligentsia in Lwów, including Professor Jan Czekanowski, the father of Polish anthropology, and the bacteriologist, Professor Rudolf Stefan Weigl.

In 1939 Szybalski graduated from the famous Gymnasium no. 8 in Lwów. After World War II broke out, from 23 September 1939, Lwów was occupied by the Soviet Union. Szybalski joined the Chemistry Department at the Lwów Polytechnic, where he was captivated by the lectures of Professor Adolf Joszt, a leading expert on processes of fermentation. Joszt even then held a vision of developing science in the direction of genetic engineering and biotechnology, which had a direct influence on Szybalski's future scientific development. After the German attack on the Soviet Union, in 1941 Lwów was occupied by the Nazis. Szybalski survived the occupation by working as a feeder of lice in Rudolf Weigl's institute for typhus research.

== Career in the United States ==
Szybalski subsequently emigrated to the United States and became a professor of oncology at the McArdle Laboratory for Cancer Research, University of Wisconsin–Madison Medical School.

The research he conducted in the United States began with genetic studies of drug resistance that led to the use of multi-drug therapy that is nowadays widely used to treat bacterial and viral infections and cancer. His studies of the antibiotic-producing soil microorganism, Streptomyces, yielded information that was useful in the commercial production of streptomycin, an effective therapeutic for treating tuberculosis.

He served as the first Editor-in-Chief of the journal Gene from 1976 to 1996. He published 145 academic papers, 82 of which were published in Gene reflecting the major impact that he had on the field of molecular genetics. His best cited paper was a highly influential study that was published in 1979 in which he published a comprehensive molecular map of bacteriophage-lambda. This study was cited nearly 300 times and is particularly important, because bacteriophage-lambda was used for the early cloning of recombinant DNA. The use of recombination vectors like lambda permitted cloning of large human genomic DNAs that did not fit into small plasmid vectors and the use of lambda provided the basis for the modern era of human genetics.

He died in December 2020 in Madison, Wisconsin at the age of 99.

== See also ==
- Szybalski's rule
- List of Polish medical researchers
- He is a member of the Kosciuszko Foundation Collegium of Eminent Scientists of Polish Origin and Ancestry (2014)
