= Erwin Chargaff =

American biochemist (1905–2002)

- Born: 11 August 1905; Czernowitz, Duchy of Bukovina, Austria-Hungary
- Died: 20 June 2002 (aged 96); New York City, United States
- Education: Gymnasium Wasagasse, Vienna College of Technology (1924–1928)
- Known for: Chargaff's rules
- Spouse: Vera Broido (m. 1928; died 1995)
- Children: Thomas Chargaff
- Awards: Pasteur Medal (1949), National Medal of Science (1974)
- Scientific career
- Fields: Biochemistry
- Workplaces: Yale University (1925–1930), University of Berlin (1930–1933), Pasteur Institute (1933–1934), Columbia University (1935–1974), Roosevelt Hospital (1974–1992)
- Doctoral advisor: Fritz Feigl
- Doctoral students: Seymour S. Cohen, Boris Magasanik

Erwin Chargaff (11 August 1905 – 20 June 2002) was an Austro-Hungarian-born American biochemist, writer, and professor of biochemistry at Columbia University medical school. A Bucovinian Jew who immigrated to the United States during the Nazi regime, he penned a well-reviewed autobiography, Heraclitean Fire: Sketches from a Life Before Nature. Through careful experimentation, Chargaff discovered two rules, called Chargaff's rules, which helped lead to the discovery of the double helix structure of DNA.

== Early life ==
Chargaff was born on 11 August 1905 to a Jewish family in Czernowitz, Duchy of Bukovina, Austria-Hungary, which is now Chernivtsi, Ukraine.

At the outbreak of World War I, his family moved to Vienna, where he attended the Maximiliansgymnasium (now the Gymnasium Wasagasse). He then went on to the Vienna College of Technology (Technische Hochschule Wien) where he met his future wife Vera Broido.

From 1924 to 1928, Chargaff studied chemistry in Vienna, and earned a doctorate working under the direction of Fritz Feigl.

He married Vera Broido in 1928. Chargaff had one son, Thomas Chargaff.

From 1925 to 1930, Chargaff served as the Milton Campbell Research fellow in organic chemistry at Yale University, but he did not like New Haven, Connecticut. Chargaff returned to Europe, where he lived from 1930 to 1934, serving first as the assistant in charge of chemistry for the department of bacteriology and public health at the University of Berlin (1930–1933) and then, being forced to resign his position in Germany as a result of the Nazi policies against Jews, as a research associate at the Pasteur Institute in Paris (1933–1934).

== Columbia University ==
Chargaff immigrated to Manhattan, New York City in 1935, taking a position as a research associate in the department of biochemistry at Columbia University, where he spent most of his professional career. Chargaff became an assistant professor in 1938 and a professor in 1952. After serving as department chair from 1970 to 1974, Chargaff retired as professor emeritus. After his retirement as professor emeritus, Chargaff moved his lab to Roosevelt Hospital, where he continued to work until his retirement in 1992.

He became an American citizen in 1940.

During his time at Columbia, Chargaff published numerous scientific papers, dealing primarily with the study of nucleic acids such as DNA using chromatographic techniques. He became interested in DNA in 1944 after Oswald Avery identified the molecule as the basis of heredity. Cohen says that "Almost alone among the scientists of this time, Chargaff accepted the unusual Avery paper and concluded that genetic differences among DNAs must be reflected in chemical differences among these substances. He was actually the first biochemist to reorganize his laboratory to test this hypothesis, which he went on to prove by 1949." Chargaff said of the Avery discovery: "I saw before me (in 1944), in dark contours, the beginning of a grammar of biology", and in 1950 he published a paper with the conclusion that the amounts of adenine and thymine in DNA were roughly the same, as were the amounts of cytosine and guanine. This later became known as the first of Chargaff's rules. Instrumental in his DNA discoveries were the innovation of paper chromatography, and the commercially available ultraviolet spectrophotometer tool.

Chargaff lectured about his results at Cambridge University in 1952, with Watson and Crick in attendance.

== Chargaff's rules ==
Key conclusions from Erwin Chargaff's work are now known as Chargaff's rules. The first and best known achievement was to show that in natural DNA the number of guanine units equals the number of cytosine units and the number of adenine units equals the number of thymine units. In human DNA, for example, the four bases are present in these percentages: A=30.9% and T=29.4%; G=19.9% and C=19.8%. This strongly hinted towards the base pair makeup of the DNA, although Chargaff did not explicitly state this connection himself. For this research, Chargaff is credited with disproving the tetranucleotide hypothesis (Phoebus Levene's widely accepted hypothesis that DNA was composed of a large number of repeats of GACT). Most researchers had previously assumed that deviations from equimolar base ratios (G = A = C = T) were due to experimental error, but Chargaff documented that the variation was real, with [C + G] typically being slightly less abundant. He did his experiments with the newly developed paper chromatography and ultraviolet spectrophotometer. Chargaff met Francis Crick and James D. Watson at Cambridge in 1952, and, despite not getting along with them personally, he explained his findings to them. Chargaff's research would later help the Watson and Crick laboratory team to deduce the double helical structure of DNA.

The second of Chargaff's rules is that the composition of DNA varies from one species to another, in particular in the relative amounts of A, G, T, and C bases. Such evidence of molecular diversity, which had been presumed absent from DNA, made DNA a more credible candidate for the genetic material than protein.

== Later life ==
Beginning in the 1950s, Chargaff became increasingly outspoken about the failure of the field of molecular biology, claiming that molecular biology was "running riot and doing things that can never be justified". He believed that human knowledge will always be limited in relation to the complexity of the natural world, and that it is simply dangerous when humans believe that the world is a machine, even assuming that humans can have full knowledge of its workings. He also believed that in a world that functions as a complex system of interdependency and interconnectedness, genetic engineering of life will inevitably have unforeseen consequences.

After Francis Crick, James Watson and Maurice Wilkins received the 1962 Nobel Prize for their work on discovering the double helix of DNA, Chargaff withdrew from his lab and wrote to scientists all over the world about his exclusion.

Chargaff warned in his 1978 book Heraclitean Fire of a "molecular Auschwitz" that "the technology of genetic engineering poses a greater threat to the world than the advent of nuclear technology. An irreversible attack on the biosphere is something so unheard of, so unthinkable to previous generations, that I only wish that mine had not been guilty of it".

Helping a few couples condemned to childlessness towards getting a child may strike the obstetrical cytologist as such a laudable step, but we can see the beginning of human husbandry, of industrial breeding factories... Who can deny the scientific interest attaching to the production of chimaeras, to the study of human embryonic growth in an animal uterus? ... What I see coming is a gigantic slaughterhouse, a molecular Auschwitz, in which valuable enzymes, hormones and so on will be extracted instead of gold teeth.

— Erwin Chargaff, Heraclitean Fire

The IVF technique earned his scathing disapprobation. In 1987, "Engineering a Molecular Nightmare" was published in the journal Nature, which was then sent by David Alton and his colleagues in the All-Party Parliamentary Pro-Life Group (APPPLG) to every Westminster MP in an effort to minimise the forthcoming harm caused by the Human Fertilisation and Embryology Act 1990.

Chargaff wrote in 2002 that "There are two nuclei that man should never have touched: the atomic nucleus and the cell nucleus. The technology of genetic engineering poses a greater threat to the world than the advent of nuclear technology."

My life has been marked by two immense and fateful discoveries: the splitting of the atom, the recognition of the chemistry of heredity and its subsequent manipulation. It is the mistreatment of nucleus that, in both instances, lies at the basis: the nucleus of the atom, the nucleus of the cell. In both instances do I have the feeling that science has transgressed a barrier that should have remained inviolate. As happens often in science, the first discoveries were made by thoroughly admirable men, but the crowd that came right after had a more mephitic smell.

— Chargaff in Weintraub (2002)

Chargaff died later that year on 20 June 2002 in Manhattan, New York City.

== Honors ==
Honors awarded to him include the Pasteur Medal (1949); Carl Neuberg Medal (1958); Charles Leopold Mayer Prize; inaugural Heineken Prize (Amsterdam, 1964); Gregor Mendel Medal (Halle, 1968); and the National Medal of Science (1974).

Elected to the American Academy of Arts and Sciences (1961), the National Academy of Sciences (1965), and the American Philosophical Society (1979) and the German Academy of Sciences.

Honorary Doctorate awarded by Columbia University in 1975.

== Books authored ==
- Chargaff, Erwin (1978). Heraclitean Fire: Sketches from a Life Before Nature. Rockefeller University Press. ISBN 0-874-70029-9 – via Internet Archive.
- Unbegreifliches Geheimnis. Wissenschaft als Kampf für und gegen die Natur. Stuttgart: Klett-Cotta, 1980, ISBN 3-608-95452-X
- Bemerkungen. Stuttgart: Klett-Cotta, 1981, ISBN 3-12-901631-7
- Warnungstafeln. Die Vergangenheit spricht zur Gegenwart. Stuttgart: Klett-Cotta, 1982, ISBN 3-608-95004-4
- Kritik der Zukunft. Essay. Stuttgart: Klett-Cotta, 1983, ISBN 3-608-93576-2
- Zeugenschaft. Essays über Sprache und Wissenschaft. Stuttgart: Klett-Cotta, 1985, ISBN 3-608-95373-6
- Serious Questions, An ABC of Sceptical Reflections. Boston, Basel, Stuttgart: Birkhäuser, 1986
- Abscheu vor der Weltgeschichte. Fragmente vom Menschen. Stuttgart: Klett-Cotta, 1988, ISBN 3-608-93531-2
- Alphabetische Anschläge. Stuttgart: Klett-Cotta, 1989, ISBN 3-608-95646-8
- Vorläufiges Ende. Ein Dreigespräch. Stuttgart: Klett-Cotta, 1990, ISBN 3-608-95443-0
- Vermächtnis. Essays. Stuttgart: Klett-Cotta, 1992, ISBN 3-608-95851-7
- Über das Lebendige. Ausgewählte Essays. Stuttgart: Klett-Cotta, 1993, ISBN 3-608-95976-9
- Armes Amerika – Arme Welt. Stuttgart: Klett-Cotta, 1994, ISBN 3-608-93291-7
- Ein zweites Leben. Autobiographisches und andere Texte. Stuttgart: Klett-Cotta, 1995, ISBN 3-608-93313-1
- Die Aussicht vom dreizehnten Stock. Stuttgart: Klett-Cotta, 1998, ISBN 3-608-93433-2
- Brevier der Ahnungen. Eine Auswahl aus dem Werk. Stuttgart: Klett-Cotta, 2002, ISBN 3-608-93513-4
- Stimmen im Labyrinth. Über die Natur und ihre Erforschung. Stuttgart: Klett-Cotta, 2003, ISBN 3-608-93580-0

== See also ==
- Nobel Prize controversies

== Sources ==
- Erwin Chargaff Papers, American Philosophical Society
- Chargaff obituary from The Guardian, 2 July 2002
- "Chargaff obituary". The Sydney Morning Herald. 12 July 2002.
- Watson, James D.; Baker, Tania A.; Bell, Stephen B.; Gann, Alexander; Levine, Michael; Losick, Richard (2004). Molecular Biology of the Gene (5th ed.). Benjamin Cummings. ISBN 0-8053-4635-X.
- The composition of the deoxyribonucleic acid of salmon sperm by E. Chargaff, R. Lipshitz, C. Green and M. E. Hodes in Journal of Biological Chemistry (1951) volume 192 pages 223–230.
- Watson, James D. (1980) [orig. 1968]. The Double Helix: A personal account of the discovery of the structure of DNA (critical ed.). Norton. ISBN 0-393-01245-X.
