= Adolf Joszt =

Polish chemist

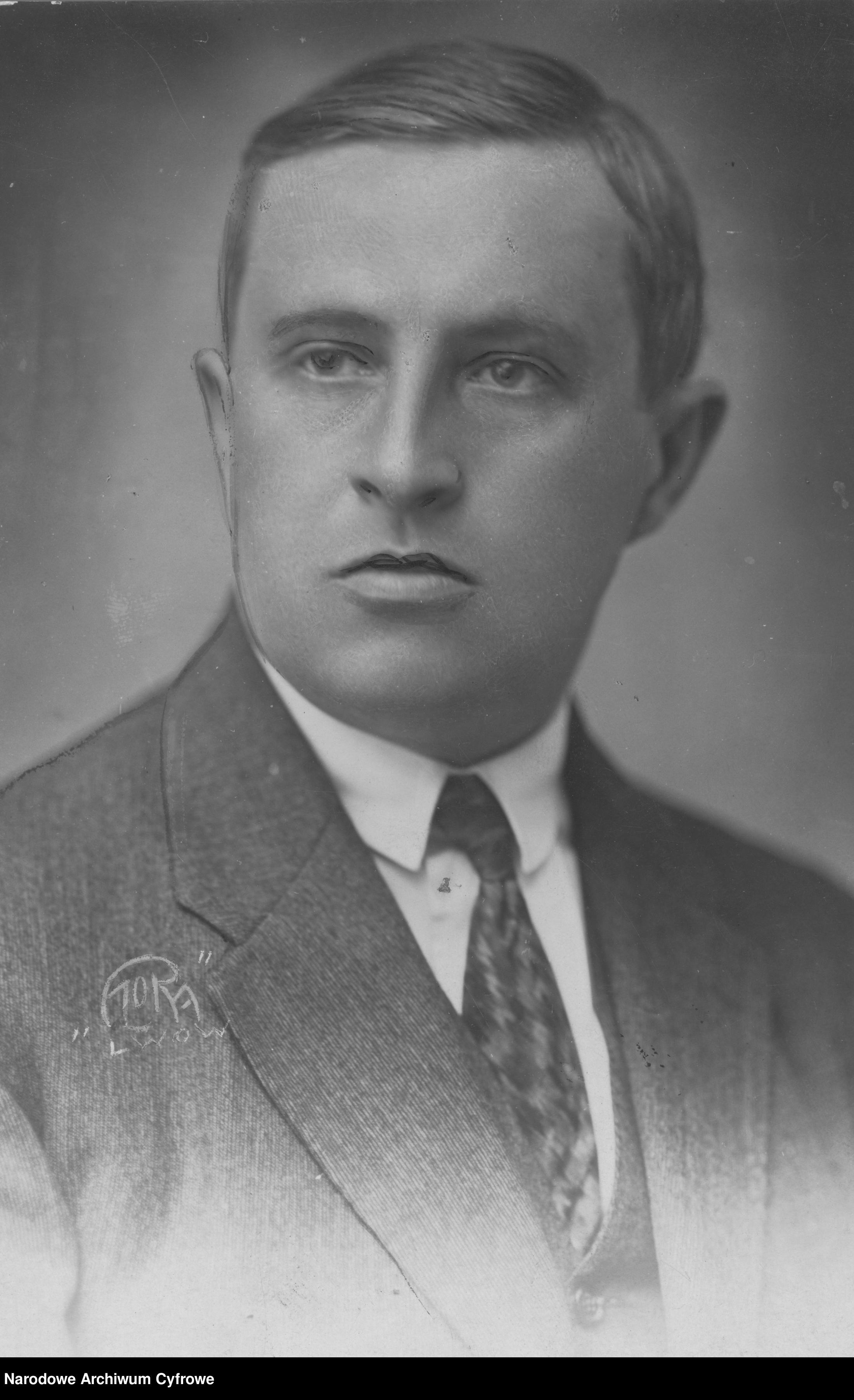
Adolf Joszt

Adolf Joszt (Polish pronunciation: [a.dɔlf jɔʂt]; born 1889 in Lviv - 1957 in Gliwice) was a Polish chemist, considered to be a significant precursor to the practices of biotechnology and environmental protection.
