= DNA =

Molecule that carries genetic information

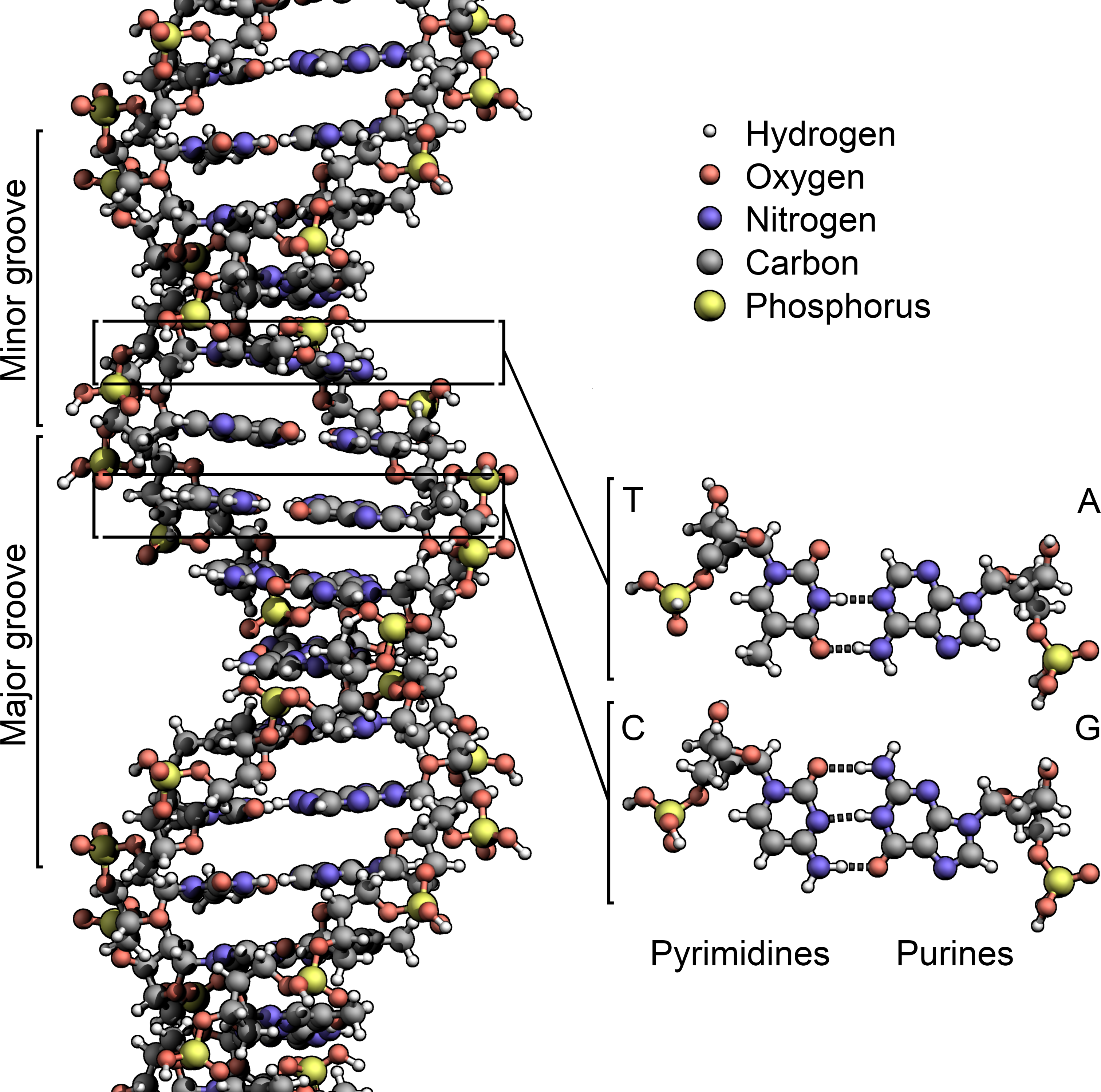
The structure of the DNA double helix (type B-DNA). The atoms in the structure are colour-coded by element and the detailed structures of two base pairs are shown in the bottom right.

A chromosome and its packaged long strand of DNA unraveled. The DNA's base pairs encode genes, which provide functions. A human DNA can have up to 500 million base pairs with thousands of genes.

Deoxyribonucleic acid ( DNA) is a polymer composed of two polynucleotide chains that coil around each other in a double helical structure. DNA carries genetic instructions for the development, functioning, growth and reproduction of all known organisms and many viruses. DNA and ribonucleic acid (RNA) are the two nucleic acids found in all life.

The two DNA strands are series of monomeric units called nucleotides. Each nucleotide is composed of one of four nitrogen-containing nucleobases (cytosine [C], guanine [G], adenine [A] or thymine [T]), a deoxyribose sugar, and a phosphate group. The nucleotides are joined to one another in a chain by covalent bonds (known as the phosphodiester bonds) between the sugar of one nucleotide and the phosphate of the next, resulting in an alternating sugar-phosphate backbone. The nitrogenous bases of the two separate polynucleotide strands are bound together, according to Watson–Crick base pairing rules (A with T and C with G), with hydrogen bonds to make double-stranded DNA. Thymine and cytosine are single-ringed pyrimidines and adenine and guanine are double-ringed purines.

Both strands of double-stranded DNA store the same biological information. This information is replicated when the two strands separate. The two strands of DNA run in opposite directions to each other and are thus antiparallel. Attached to each sugar is one of four types of nucleobases (or bases). It is the sequence of these four nucleobases along the backbone that encodes genetic information. RNA strands are created using DNA strands as a template in a process called transcription, where DNA bases are exchanged for their corresponding bases except in the case of thymine (T), for which RNA substitutes uracil (U). Under the genetic code, these RNA strands specify the sequence of amino acids within proteins in a process called translation.

Within eukaryotic cells, DNA is organized into long structures called chromosomes. Before typical cell division, these chromosomes are duplicated in the process of DNA replication, providing a complete set of chromosomes for each daughter cell. Eukaryotic organisms (animals, plants, fungi and protists) store most of their DNA inside the cell nucleus as nuclear DNA, and some in the mitochondria as mitochondrial DNA or in chloroplasts as chloroplast DNA. In contrast, prokaryotes (bacteria and archaea) store their DNA only in the cytoplasm, in circular chromosomes. Within eukaryotic chromosomes, chromatin proteins, such as histones, compact and organize DNA. These compacting structures guide the interactions between DNA and other proteins, helping control which parts of the DNA are transcribed.

== Properties ==
Chemical structure of DNA; hydrogen bonds shown as dotted lines. Each end of the double helix has an exposed 5' phosphate on one strand and an exposed 3′ hydroxyl group (—OH) on the other.

DNA is a long polymer made from repeating units called nucleotides. DNA does not usually exist as a single strand, but instead as a pair of strands that are held tightly together. These two long strands coil around each other, in the shape of a double helix. The nucleotide contains both a segment of the backbone of the molecule (which holds the chain together) and a nucleobase (which interacts with the other DNA strand in the helix). A nucleobase linked to a sugar is called a nucleoside, and a base linked to a sugar and to one or more phosphate groups is called a nucleotide. A biopolymer comprising multiple linked nucleotides (as in DNA) is called a polynucleotide.

The structure of DNA is dynamic along its length, being capable of coiling into tight loops and other shapes. In all species it is composed of two helical chains, bound to each other by hydrogen bonds. The two chains are coiled around the same axis (but not directly opposite one to the other), and have the same pitch of 34 ångströms (3.4 nm). Ignoring the identities of the bases, the line group is D_{1}(q), where q is the number of turns per base pair, which is around a tenth of a full turn. In the usual form (B-DNA), the twist is right-handed, like a normal screw that advances when turned clockwise. The pair of chains have a radius of 10 Å (1.0 nm). According to another study, when measured in a different solution, the DNA chain measured 22–26 Å (2.2–2.6 nm) wide, and one nucleotide unit measured 3.3 Å (0.33 nm) long. The buoyant density of most DNA is 1.7 g/cm^{3}.

The backbone of the DNA strand is made from alternating phosphate and sugar groups. The sugar in DNA is 2-deoxyribose, which is a pentose (five-carbon) sugar. The sugars are joined by phosphate groups that form phosphodiester bonds between the third and fifth carbon atoms of adjacent sugar rings. These are known as the 3′-end (three prime end), and 5′-end (five prime end) carbons, the prime symbol being used to distinguish these carbon atoms from those of the base to which the deoxyribose forms a glycosidic bond.

Therefore, any DNA strand normally has one end at which there is a phosphate group attached to the 5′ carbon of a ribose (the 5′ phosphoryl) and another end at which there is a free hydroxyl group attached to the 3′ carbon of a ribose (the 3′ hydroxyl). The orientation of the 3′ and 5′ carbons along the sugar-phosphate backbone confers directionality (sometimes called polarity) to each DNA strand. In a nucleic acid double helix, the direction of the nucleotides in one strand is opposite to their direction in the other strand: the strands are antiparallel. The asymmetric ends of DNA strands are said to have a directionality of five prime end (5′), and three prime end (3′), with the 5′ end having a terminal phosphate group and the 3′ end a terminal hydroxyl group. One major difference between DNA and RNA is the sugar, with the 2-deoxyribose in DNA being replaced by the related pentose sugar ribose in RNA.

A section of DNA. The bases lie horizontally between the two spiraling strands (animated version).

The DNA double helix is stabilized primarily by two forces: hydrogen bonds between nucleotides and base-stacking interactions among aromatic nucleobases. The four bases found in DNA are adenine (A), cytosine (C), guanine (G) and thymine (T). These four bases are attached to the sugar-phosphate to form the complete nucleotide, as shown for adenosine monophosphate. Adenine pairs with thymine and guanine pairs with cytosine, forming A–T and G–C base pairs.

=== Nucleobase classification ===
The nucleobases are classified into two types: the purines, A and G, which are fused five- and six-membered heterocyclic compounds, and the pyrimidines, the six-membered rings C and T. A fifth pyrimidine nucleobase, uracil (U), usually takes the place of thymine in RNA and differs from thymine by lacking a methyl group on its ring. In addition to RNA and DNA, many artificial nucleic acid analogues have been created to study the properties of nucleic acids, or for use in biotechnology.

=== Non-canonical bases ===
Modified bases occur in DNA. The first of these to be recognized was 5-methylcytosine, which was found in the genome of Mycobacterium tuberculosis in 1925. The reason for the presence of these noncanonical bases in bacterial viruses (bacteriophages) is to avoid the restriction enzymes present in bacteria. This enzyme system acts at least in part as a molecular immune system protecting bacteria from infection by viruses. Modifications of the bases cytosine and adenine, the more common and modified DNA bases, play vital roles in the epigenetic control of gene expression in plants and animals.

A number of noncanonical bases are known to occur in DNA. Most of these are modifications of the canonical bases plus uracil.

- Modified adenine
  - N6-carbamoyl-methyladenine
  - N6-methyadenine
- Modified guanine
  - 7-Deazaguanine
  - 7-Methylguanine
- Modified cytosine
  - N4-methylcytosine
  - 5-Carboxylcytosine
  - 5-Formylcytosine
  - 5-Glycosylhydroxymethylcytosine
  - 5-Hydroxycytosine
  - 5-Methylcytosine
- Modified thymidine
  - α-Glutamythymidine
  - α-Putrescinylthymine
- Uracil and modifications
  - Base J
  - Uracil
  - 5-Dihydroxypentauracil
  - 5-Hydroxymethyldeoxyuracil
- Others
  - Deoxyarchaeosine
  - 2,6-Diaminopurine (2-aminoadenine)

=== Grooves ===
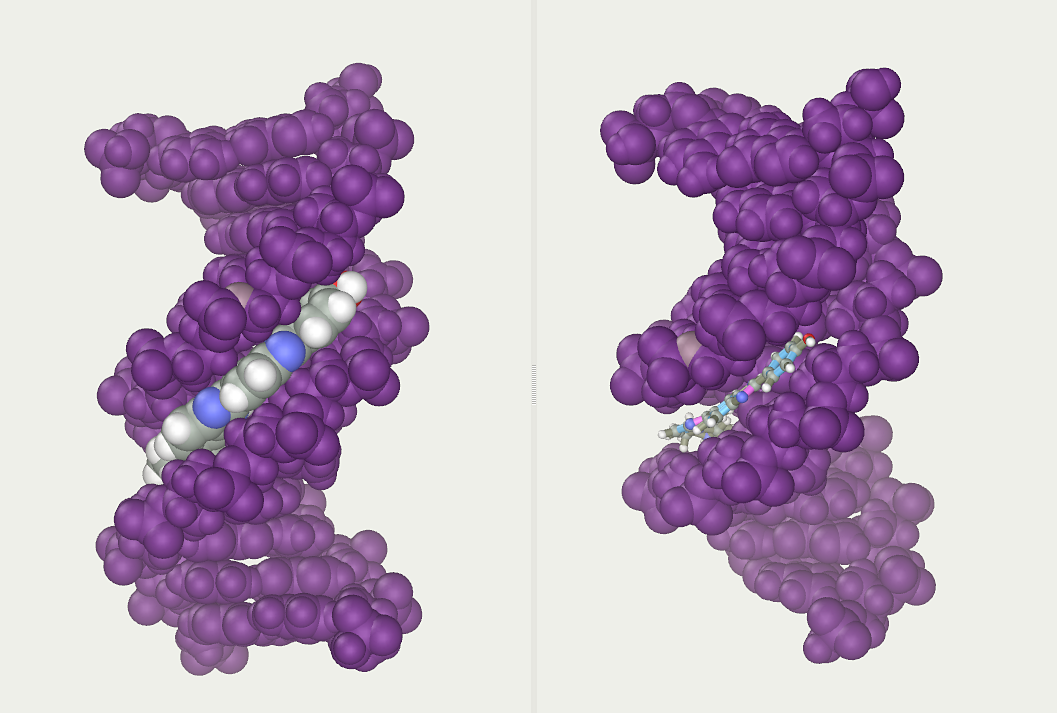
DNA major and minor grooves. The latter is a binding site for the Hoechst stain dye 33258.

Twin helical strands form the DNA backbone. Another double helix may be found tracing the spaces, or grooves, between the strands. These voids are adjacent to the base pairs and may provide a binding site. As the strands are not symmetrically located with respect to each other, the grooves are unequally sized. The major groove is 22 ångströms (2.2 nm) wide, while the minor groove is 12 Å (1.2 nm) in width. Due to the larger width of the major groove, the edges of the bases are more accessible in the major groove than in the minor groove. As a result, proteins such as transcription factors that can bind to specific sequences in double-stranded DNA usually make contact with the sides of the bases exposed in the major groove. This situation varies in unusual conformations of DNA within the cell (see below), but the major and minor grooves are always named to reflect the differences in width that would be seen if the DNA was twisted back into the ordinary B form.

=== Base pairing ===

Top, a GC base pair with three hydrogen bonds. Bottom, an AT base pair with two hydrogen bonds. Non-covalent hydrogen bonds between the pairs are shown as dashed lines.

In a DNA double helix, each type of nucleobase on one strand bonds with just one type of nucleobase on the other strand. This is called complementary base pairing. Purines form hydrogen bonds to pyrimidines, with adenine bonding only to thymine in two hydrogen bonds, and cytosine bonding only to guanine in three hydrogen bonds. This arrangement of two nucleotides binding together across the double helix (from six-carbon ring to six-carbon ring) is called a Watson–Crick base pair. DNA with high GC-content is more stable than DNA with low GC-content. A Hoogsteen base pair (hydrogen bonding the 6-carbon ring to the 5-carbon ring) is a rare variation of base-pairing. As hydrogen bonds are not covalent, they can be broken and rejoined relatively easily. The two strands of DNA in a double helix can thus be pulled apart like a zipper, either by a mechanical force or high temperature. As a result of this base pair complementarity, all the information in the double-stranded sequence of a DNA helix is duplicated on each strand, which is vital in DNA replication. This reversible and specific interaction between complementary base pairs is critical for all the functions of DNA in organisms.

==== ssDNA vs. dsDNA ====
Most DNA molecules are actually two polymer strands, bound together in a helical fashion by noncovalent bonds; this double-stranded (dsDNA) structure is maintained largely by the intrastrand base stacking interactions, which are strongest for G–C stacks. The two strands can come apart—a process known as melting—to form two single-stranded DNA (ssDNA) molecules. Melting occurs at high temperatures, low salt and high pH (low pH also melts DNA, but since DNA is unstable due to acid depurination, low pH is rarely used).

The stability of the dsDNA form depends not only on the GC-content (% G–C basepairs) but also on sequence (since stacking is sequence specific) and also length (longer molecules are more stable). The stability can be measured in various ways; a common way is the melting temperature (also called T_{m} value), which is the temperature at which 50% of the double-strand molecules are converted to single-strand molecules; melting temperature is dependent on ionic strength and the concentration of DNA. As a result, it is both the percentage of GC base pairs and the overall length of a DNA double helix that determines the strength of the association between the two strands of DNA. Long DNA helices with a high GC-content have more strongly interacting strands, while short helices with high AT content have more weakly interacting strands. In biology, parts of the DNA double helix that need to separate easily, such as the TATAAT Pribnow box in some promoters, tend to have a high AT content, making the strands easier to pull apart.

In the laboratory, the strength of this interaction can be measured by finding the melting temperature T_{m} necessary to break half of the hydrogen bonds. When all the base pairs in a DNA double helix melt, the strands separate and exist in solution as two entirely independent molecules. These single-stranded DNA molecules have no single common shape, but some conformations are more stable than others.

=== Amount ===
Schematic karyogram of a human. It shows 22 homologous chromosomes, both the female (XX) and male (XY) versions of the sex chromosome (bottom right), as well as the mitochondrial genome (to scale at bottom left). The blue scale to the left of each chromosome pair (and the mitochondrial genome) shows its length in terms of millions of DNA base pairs.

In humans, the total female diploid nuclear genome per cell extends for 6.37 gigabase pairs (Gbp), is 208.23 cm long and weighs 6.51 picograms (pg). Male values are 6.27 Gbp, 205.00 cm, 6.41 pg. Each DNA polymer can contain hundreds of millions of nucleotides, such as in chromosome 1. Chromosome 1 is the largest human chromosome with approximately 220 million base pairs, and would be 85 mm long if straightened.

In eukaryotes, in addition to nuclear DNA, there is also mitochondrial DNA (mtDNA) which encodes certain proteins used by the mitochondria. The mtDNA is usually relatively small in comparison to the nuclear DNA. For example, the human mitochondrial DNA forms closed circular molecules, each of which contains 16,569 DNA base pairs, with each such molecule normally containing a full set of the mitochondrial genes. Each human mitochondrion contains, on average, approximately 5 such mtDNA molecules. Each human cell contains approximately 100 mitochondria, giving a total number of mtDNA molecules per human cell of approximately 500. However, the amount of mitochondria per cell also varies by cell type, and an egg cell can contain 100,000 mitochondria, corresponding to up to 1,500,000 copies of the mitochondrial genome (constituting up to 90% of the DNA of the cell).

=== Sense and antisense ===
A DNA sequence is called a "sense" sequence if it is the same as that of a messenger RNA copy that is translated into protein. The sequence on the opposite strand is called the "antisense" sequence. Both sense and antisense sequences can exist on different parts of the same strand of DNA (i.e. both strands can contain both sense and antisense sequences). In both prokaryotes and eukaryotes, antisense RNA sequences are produced, but the functions of these RNAs are not entirely clear. One proposal is that antisense RNAs are involved in regulating gene expression through RNA–RNA base pairing.

A few DNA sequences in prokaryotes and eukaryotes, and more in plasmids and viruses, blur the distinction between sense and antisense strands by having overlapping genes. In these cases, some DNA sequences do double duty, encoding one protein when read along one strand, and a second protein when read in the opposite direction along the other strand. In bacteria, this overlap may be involved in the regulation of gene transcription, while in viruses, overlapping genes increase the amount of information that can be encoded within the small viral genome.

=== Supercoiling ===
DNA can be twisted like a rope in a process called DNA supercoiling. With DNA in its "relaxed" state, a strand usually circles the axis of the double helix once every 10.4 base pairs, but if the DNA is twisted the strands become more tightly or more loosely wound. If the DNA is twisted in the direction of the helix, this is positive supercoiling, and the bases are held more tightly together. If they are twisted in the opposite direction, this is negative supercoiling, and the bases come apart more easily. In nature, most DNA has slight negative supercoiling that is introduced by enzymes called topoisomerases. These enzymes are also needed to relieve the twisting stresses introduced into DNA strands during processes such as transcription and DNA replication.

=== Alternative DNA structures ===
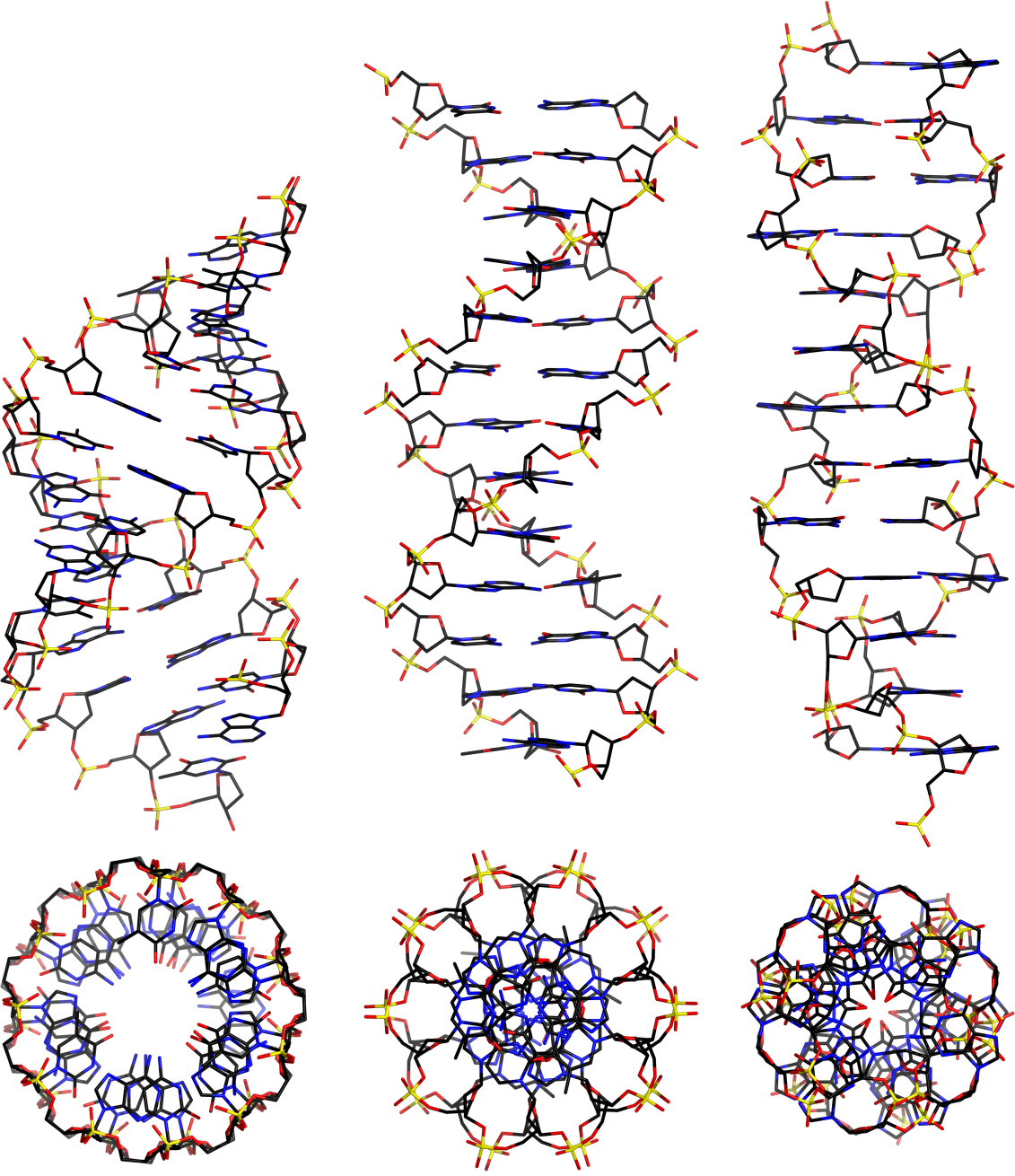
From left to right, the structures of A, B and Z-DNA

DNA exists in many possible conformations that include A-DNA, B-DNA, and Z-DNA forms, although only B-DNA and Z-DNA have been directly observed in functional organisms. The conformation that DNA adopts depends on the hydration level, DNA sequence, the amount and direction of supercoiling, chemical modifications of the bases, the type and concentration of metal ions, and the presence of polyamines in solution.

The first published reports of A-DNA X-ray diffraction patterns—and also B-DNA—used analyses based on Patterson functions that provided only a limited amount of structural information for oriented fibers of DNA. An alternative analysis was proposed by Wilkins et al. in 1953 for the in vivo B-DNA X-ray diffraction-scattering patterns of highly hydrated DNA fibers in terms of squares of Bessel functions. In the same journal, James Watson and Francis Crick presented their molecular modeling analysis of the DNA X-ray diffraction patterns to suggest that the structure was a double helix.

Although the B-DNA form is most common under the conditions found in cells, it is not a well-defined conformation but a family of related DNA conformations that occur at the high hydration levels present in cells. Their corresponding X-ray diffraction and scattering patterns are characteristic of molecular paracrystals with a significant degree of disorder.

Compared to B-DNA, the A-DNA form is a wider right-handed spiral, with a shallow, wide minor groove and a narrower, deeper major groove. The A form occurs under non-physiological conditions in partly dehydrated samples of DNA, while in the cell it may be produced in hybrid pairings of DNA and RNA strands, and in enzyme-DNA complexes. Segments of DNA where the bases have been chemically modified by methylation may undergo a larger change in conformation and adopt the Z form. Here, the strands turn about the helical axis in a left-handed spiral, the opposite of the more common B form. These unusual structures can be recognized by specific Z-DNA binding proteins and may be involved in the regulation of transcription.

=== Alternative DNA chemistry ===
For many years, exobiologists have proposed the existence of a shadow biosphere, a postulated microbial biosphere of Earth that uses radically different biochemical and molecular processes than currently known life. One of the proposals was the existence of lifeforms that use arsenic instead of phosphorus in DNA. A report in 2010 of the possibility in the bacterium GFAJ-1 was announced, though the research was disputed, and evidence suggests the bacterium actively prevents the incorporation of arsenic into the DNA backbone and other biomolecules.

=== Quadruplex structures ===
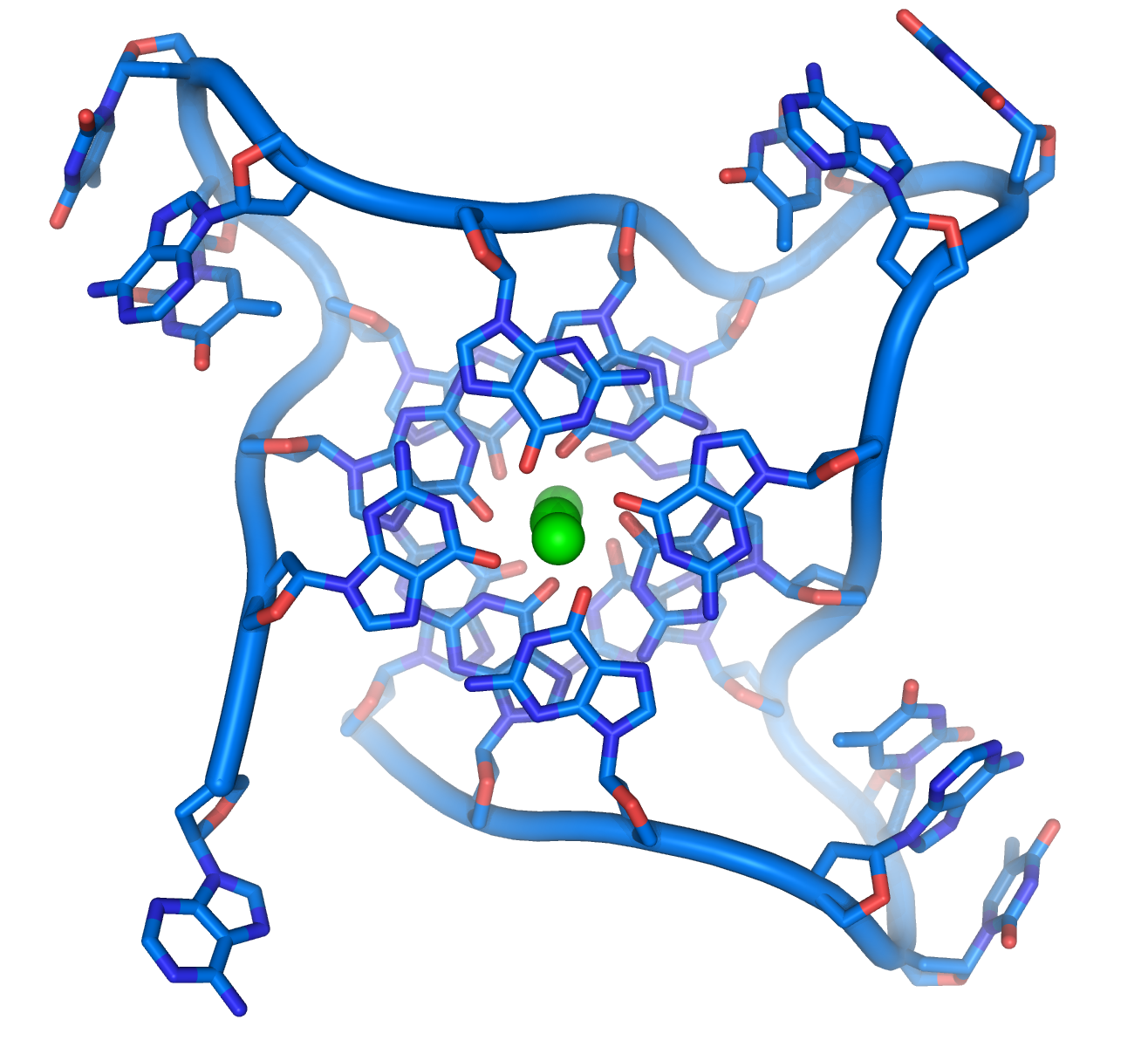
DNA quadruplex formed by telomere repeats. The looped conformation of the DNA backbone is very different from the typical DNA helix. The green spheres in the center represent potassium ions.

At the ends of the linear chromosomes are specialized regions of DNA called telomeres. The main function of these regions is to allow the cell to replicate chromosome ends using the enzyme telomerase, as the enzymes that normally replicate DNA cannot copy the extreme 3′ ends of chromosomes. These specialized chromosome caps also help protect the DNA ends, and stop the DNA repair systems in the cell from treating them as damage to be corrected. In human cells, telomeres are usually lengths of single-stranded DNA containing several thousand repeats of a simple TTAGGG sequence.

These guanine-rich sequences may stabilize chromosome ends by forming structures of stacked sets of four-base units, rather than the usual base pairs found in other DNA molecules. Here, four guanine bases, known as a guanine tetrad, form a flat plate. These flat four-base units then stack on top of each other to form a stable G-quadruplex structure. These structures are stabilized by hydrogen bonding between the edges of the bases and chelation of a metal ion in the centre of each four-base unit. Other structures can also be formed, with the central set of four bases coming from either a single strand folded around the bases, or several different parallel strands, each contributing one base to the central structure.

In addition to these stacked structures, telomeres also form large loop structures called telomere loops, or T-loops. Here, the single-stranded DNA curls around in a long circle stabilized by telomere-binding proteins. At the very end of the T-loop, the single-stranded telomere DNA is held onto a region of double-stranded DNA by the telomere strand disrupting the double-helical DNA and base pairing to one of the two strands. This triple-stranded structure is called a displacement loop or D-loop.

=== Branched DNA ===
Single branch	Multiple branches

Branched DNA can form networks containing multiple branches.

In DNA, fraying occurs when non-complementary regions exist at the end of an otherwise complementary double-strand of DNA. However, branched DNA can occur if a third strand of DNA is introduced and contains adjoining regions able to hybridize with the frayed regions of the pre-existing double-strand. Although the simplest example of branched DNA involves only three strands of DNA, complexes involving additional strands and multiple branches are also possible. Branched DNA can be used in nanotechnology to construct geometric shapes, see the section on uses in technology below.

=== Artificial bases ===
Several artificial nucleobases have been synthesized, and successfully incorporated in the eight-base DNA analogue named Hachimoji DNA. Dubbed S, B, P, and Z, these artificial bases are capable of bonding with each other in a predictable way (S–B and P–Z), maintain the double helix structure of DNA, and be transcribed to RNA. Their existence could be seen as an indication that there is nothing special about the four natural nucleobases that evolved on Earth. On the other hand, DNA is tightly related to RNA which does not only act as a transcript of DNA but also performs as molecular machines many tasks in cells. For this purpose it has to fold into a structure. It has been shown that to allow to create all possible structures at least four bases are required for the corresponding RNA, while a higher number is also possible but this would be against the natural principle of least effort.

=== Acidity ===
The phosphate groups of DNA give it similar acidic properties to phosphoric acid and it can be considered as a strong acid. It will be fully ionized at a normal cellular pH, releasing protons which leave behind negative charges on the phosphate groups. These negative charges protect DNA from breakdown by hydrolysis by repelling nucleophiles which could hydrolyze it.

=== Macroscopic appearance ===
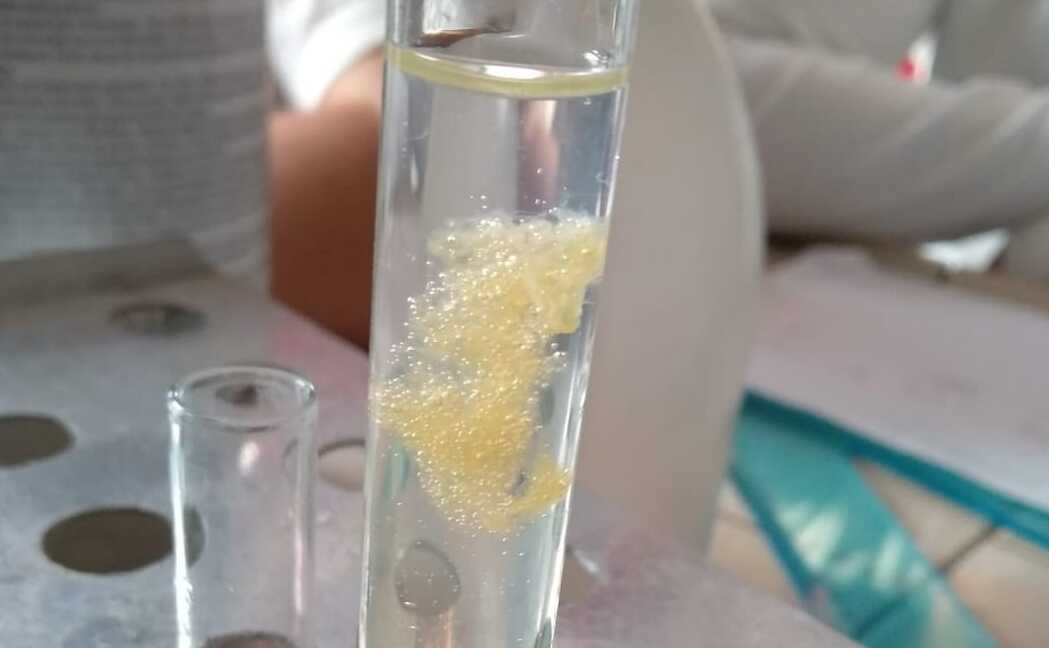
Impure DNA extracted from an orange

Pure DNA extracted from cells forms white, stringy clumps.

== Chemical modifications and altered DNA packaging ==
=== Base modifications and DNA packaging ===
cytosine	5-methylcytosine	thymine

Structure of cytosine with and without the 5-methyl group. Deamination converts 5-methylcytosine into thymine.

The expression of genes is influenced by how the DNA is packaged in chromosomes, in a structure called chromatin. Base modifications can be involved in packaging, with regions that have low or no gene expression usually containing high levels of methylation of cytosine bases. DNA packaging and its influence on gene expression can also occur by covalent modifications of the histone protein core around which DNA is wrapped in the chromatin structure or else by remodeling carried out by chromatin remodeling complexes (see Chromatin remodeling). There is, further, crosstalk between DNA methylation and histone modification, so they can coordinately affect chromatin and gene expression.

For one example, cytosine methylation produces 5-methylcytosine, which is important for X-inactivation of chromosomes. The average level of methylation varies between organisms—the worm Caenorhabditis elegans lacks cytosine methylation, while vertebrates have higher levels, with up to 1% of their DNA containing 5-methylcytosine. Despite the importance of 5-methylcytosine, it can deaminate to leave a thymine base, so methylated cytosines are particularly prone to mutations. Other base modifications include adenine methylation in bacteria, the presence of 5-hydroxymethylcytosine in the brain, and the glycosylation of uracil to produce the "J-base" in kinetoplastids.

=== Damage ===
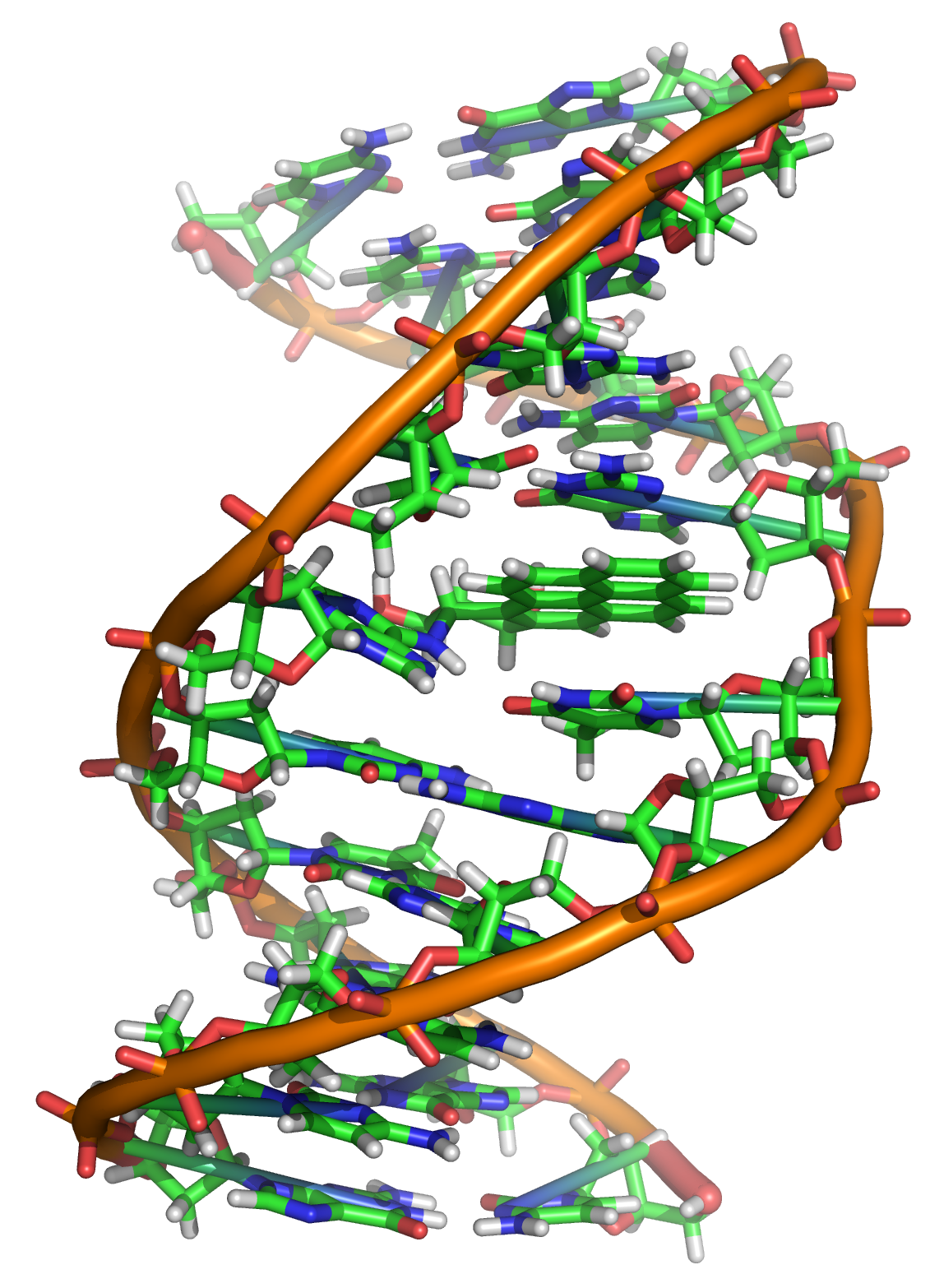
A covalent adduct between a metabolically activated form of benzo[a]pyrene, the major mutagen in tobacco smoke, and DNA

DNA can be damaged by many sorts of mutagens, which change the DNA sequence. Mutagens include oxidizing agents, alkylating agents and also high-energy electromagnetic radiation such as ultraviolet light and X-rays. The type of DNA damage produced depends on the type of mutagen. For example, UV light can damage DNA by producing thymine dimers, which are cross-links between pyrimidine bases. On the other hand, oxidants such as free radicals or hydrogen peroxide produce multiple forms of damage, including base modifications, particularly of guanosine, and double-strand breaks. A typical human cell contains about 150,000 bases that have suffered oxidative damage. Of these oxidative lesions, the most dangerous are double-strand breaks, as these are difficult to repair and can produce point mutations, insertions, deletions from the DNA sequence, and chromosomal translocations. These mutations can cause cancer. Because of inherent limits in the DNA repair mechanisms, if humans lived long enough, they would all eventually develop cancer. DNA damages that are naturally occurring, due to normal cellular processes that produce reactive oxygen species, the hydrolytic activities of cellular water, etc., also occur frequently. Although most of these damages are repaired, in any cell some DNA damage may remain despite the action of repair processes. These remaining DNA damages accumulate with age in mammalian postmitotic tissues. This accumulation appears to be an important underlying cause of aging.

Many mutagens fit into the space between two adjacent base pairs, this is called intercalation. Most intercalators are aromatic and planar molecules; examples include ethidium bromide, acridines, daunomycin, and doxorubicin. For an intercalator to fit between base pairs, the bases must separate, distorting the DNA strands by unwinding of the double helix. This inhibits both transcription and DNA replication, causing toxicity and mutations. As a result, DNA intercalators may be carcinogens, and in the case of thalidomide, a teratogen. Others such as benzo[a]pyrene diol epoxide and aflatoxin form DNA adducts that induce errors in replication. Nevertheless, due to their ability to inhibit DNA transcription and replication, other similar toxins are also used in chemotherapy to inhibit rapidly growing cancer cells.

== Biological functions ==
Location of eukaryote nuclear DNA within the chromosomes

DNA usually occurs as linear chromosomes in eukaryotes, and circular chromosomes in prokaryotes. The set of chromosomes in a cell makes up its genome; the human genome has approximately 3 billion base pairs of DNA arranged into 46 chromosomes. The information carried by DNA is held in the sequence of pieces of DNA called genes. Transmission of genetic information in genes is achieved via complementary base pairing. For example, in transcription, when a cell uses the information in a gene, the DNA sequence is copied into a complementary RNA sequence through the attraction between the DNA and the correct RNA nucleotides. Usually, this RNA copy is then used to make a matching protein sequence in a process called translation, which depends on the same interaction between RNA nucleotides. In an alternative fashion, a cell may copy its genetic information in a process called DNA replication. The details of these functions are covered in other articles; here the focus is on the interactions between DNA and other molecules that mediate the function of the genome.

=== Genomes ===
Genomic DNA is tightly and orderly packed in the process called DNA condensation, to fit the small available volumes of the cell. In eukaryotes, DNA is located in the cell nucleus, with small amounts in mitochondria and chloroplasts. In prokaryotes, the DNA is held within an irregularly shaped body in the cytoplasm called the nucleoid.

The functional genetic information in a genome is located in genes, regulatory sequences, origins of replication, centromeres, telomeres, and segments required for the three-dimensional structure of chromatin. In many complex eukaryotes, only a small fraction of the total sequence is devoted to the various functional elements. For example, in humans less than 10% of the genome has a defined functional role and the rest (90%) is probably junk DNA. (See also non-coding DNA.)

=== Transcription and translation ===
A gene is a sequence of DNA that contains genetic information and can influence the phenotype of an organism. Within a gene, the sequence of bases along a DNA strand defines a messenger RNA sequence, which then defines one or more protein sequences. The relationship between the nucleotide sequences of genes and the amino-acid sequences of proteins is determined by the rules of translation, known collectively as the genetic code. The genetic code consists of three-letter 'words' called codons formed from a sequence of three nucleotides (e.g., ACT, CAG, TTT).

In transcription, the codons of a gene are copied into messenger RNA by RNA polymerase. This RNA copy is then decoded by a ribosome that reads the RNA sequence by base-pairing the messenger RNA to transfer RNA, which carries amino acids. Since there are 4 bases in 3-letter combinations, there are 64 possible codons (4^{3} combinations). These encode the twenty standard amino acids, giving most amino acids more than one possible codon. There are also three 'stop' or 'nonsense' codons signifying the end of the coding region; these are the TAG, TAA, and TGA codons, (UAG, UAA, and UGA on the mRNA).

=== Replication ===
DNA replication: The double helix is unwound by a helicase and topoisomerase. Next, one DNA polymerase produces the leading strand copy. Another DNA polymerase binds to the lagging strand. This enzyme makes discontinuous segments (called Okazaki fragments) before DNA ligase joins them together.

Cell division is essential for an organism to grow, but, when a cell divides, it must replicate the DNA in its genome so that the two daughter cells have the same genetic information as their parent. The double-stranded structure of DNA provides a simple mechanism for DNA replication. Here, the two strands are separated and then each strand's complementary DNA sequence is recreated by an enzyme called DNA polymerase. This enzyme makes the complementary strand by finding the correct base through complementary base pairing and bonding it onto the original strand. As DNA polymerases can only extend a DNA strand in a 5′ to 3′ direction, different mechanisms are used to copy the antiparallel strands of the double helix. In this way, the base on the old strand dictates which base appears on the new strand, and the cell ends up with a perfect copy of its DNA.

=== Extracellular nucleic acids ===
Naked extracellular DNA (eDNA), most of it released by cell death, is nearly ubiquitous in the environment. Its concentration in soil may be as high as 2 μg/L, and its concentration in natural aquatic environments may be as high at 88 μg/L. Various possible functions have been proposed for eDNA: it may be involved in horizontal gene transfer; it may provide nutrients; and it may act as a buffer to recruit or titrate ions or antibiotics. Extracellular DNA acts as a functional extracellular matrix component in the biofilms of several bacterial species. It may act as a recognition factor to regulate the attachment and dispersal of specific cell types in the biofilm; it may contribute to biofilm formation; and it may contribute to the biofilm's physical strength and resistance to biological stress.

Cell-free fetal DNA is found in the blood of the mother, and can be sequenced to determine a great deal of information about the developing fetus.

Under the name of environmental DNA eDNA has seen increased use in the natural sciences as a survey tool for ecology, monitoring the movements and presence of species in water, air, or on land, and assessing an area's biodiversity.

== Interactions with proteins ==
All the functions of DNA depend on interactions with proteins. These protein interactions can be non-specific, or the protein can bind specifically to a single DNA sequence. Enzymes can also bind to DNA and of these, the polymerases that copy the DNA base sequence in transcription and DNA replication are particularly important.

=== DNA-binding proteins ===
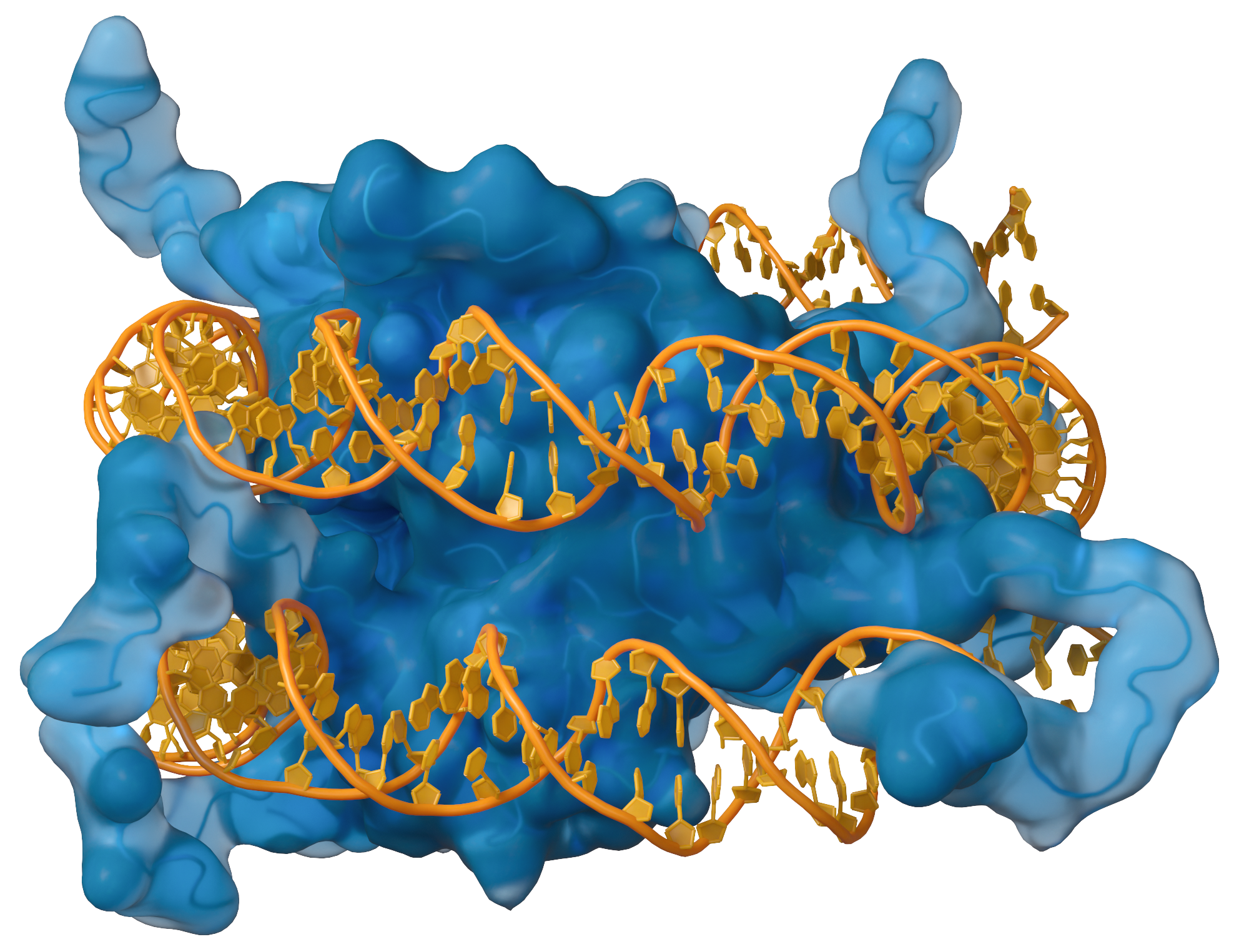
Interaction of DNA (in orange) with histones (in blue). These proteins' basic amino acids bind to the acidic phosphate groups on DNA.

Structural proteins that bind DNA are well-understood examples of non-specific DNA–protein interactions. Within chromosomes, DNA is held in complexes with structural proteins. These proteins organize the DNA into a compact structure called chromatin. In eukaryotes, this structure involves DNA binding to a complex of small basic proteins called histones, while in prokaryotes multiple types of proteins are involved. The histones form a disk-shaped complex called a nucleosome, which contains two complete turns of double-stranded DNA wrapped around its surface. These non-specific interactions are formed through basic residues in the histones, making ionic bonds to the acidic sugar-phosphate backbone of the DNA, and are thus largely independent of the base sequence. Chemical modifications of these basic amino acid residues include methylation, phosphorylation, and acetylation. These chemical changes alter the strength of the interaction between the DNA and the histones, making the DNA more or less accessible to transcription factors and changing the rate of transcription. Other non-specific DNA-binding proteins in chromatin include the high-mobility group proteins, which bind to bent or distorted DNA. These proteins are important in bending arrays of nucleosomes and arranging them into the larger structures that make up chromosomes.

A distinct group of DNA-binding proteins is the DNA-binding proteins that specifically bind single-stranded DNA. In humans, replication protein A is the best-understood member of this family and is used in processes where the double helix is separated, including DNA replication, recombination, and DNA repair. These binding proteins seem to stabilize single-stranded DNA and protect it from forming stem-loops or being degraded by nucleases.

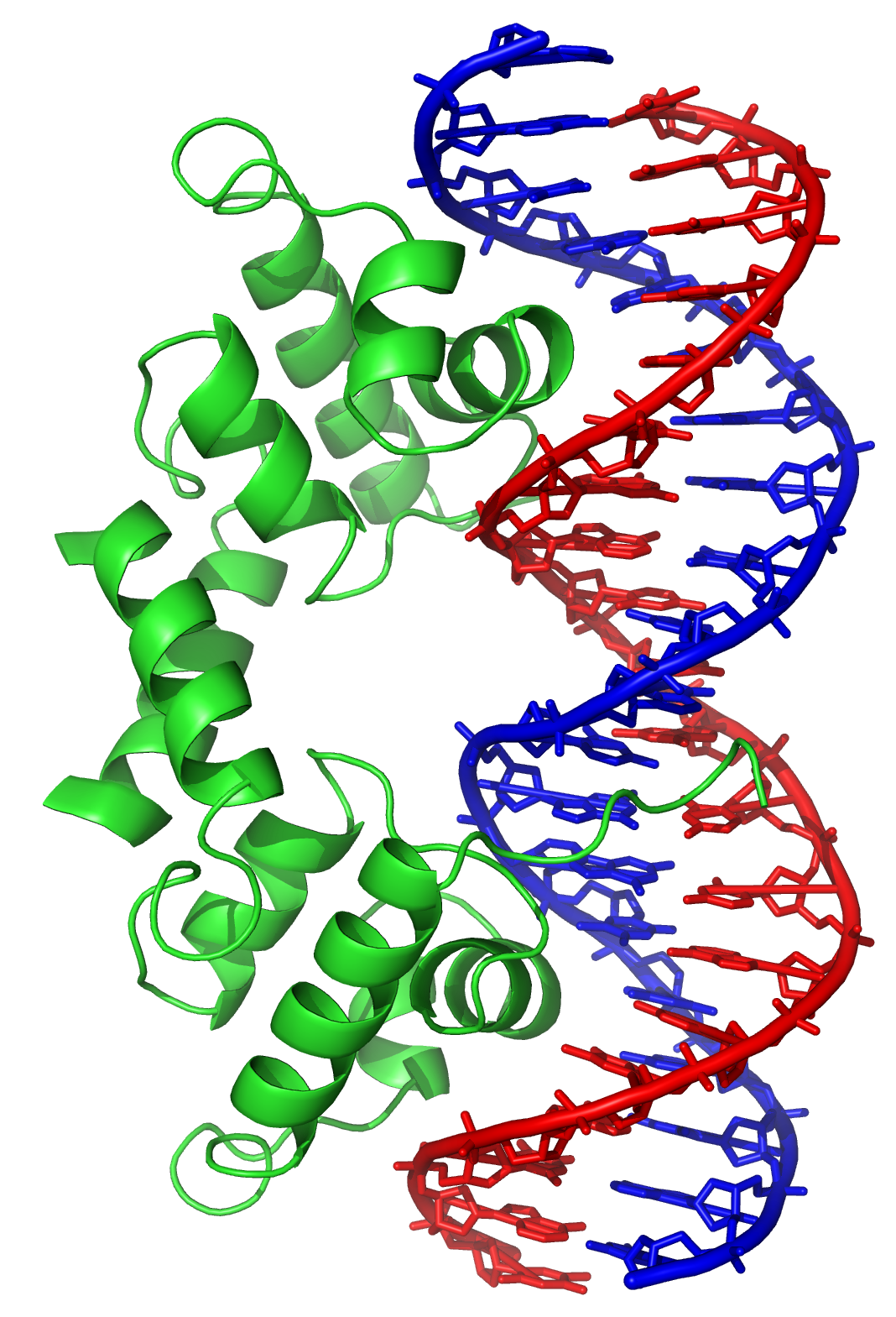
The lambda repressor helix-turn-helix transcription factor bound to its DNA target

In contrast, other proteins have evolved to bind to particular DNA sequences. The most intensively studied of these are the various transcription factors, which are proteins that regulate transcription. Each transcription factor binds to one particular set of DNA sequences and activates or inhibits the transcription of genes that have these sequences close to their promoters. The transcription factors do this in two ways. Firstly, they can bind the RNA polymerase responsible for transcription, either directly or through other mediator proteins; this locates the polymerase at the promoter and allows it to begin transcription. Alternatively, transcription factors can bind enzymes that modify the histones at the promoter. This changes the accessibility of the DNA template to the polymerase.

As these DNA targets can occur throughout an organism's genome, changes in the activity of one type of transcription factor can affect thousands of genes. Consequently, these proteins are often the targets of the signal transduction processes that control responses to environmental changes or cellular differentiation and development. The specificity of these transcription factors' interactions with DNA come from the proteins making multiple contacts to the edges of the DNA bases, allowing them to "read" the DNA sequence. Most of these base-interactions are made in the major groove, where the bases are most accessible.

=== DNA-modifying enzymes ===
==== Nucleases and ligases ====
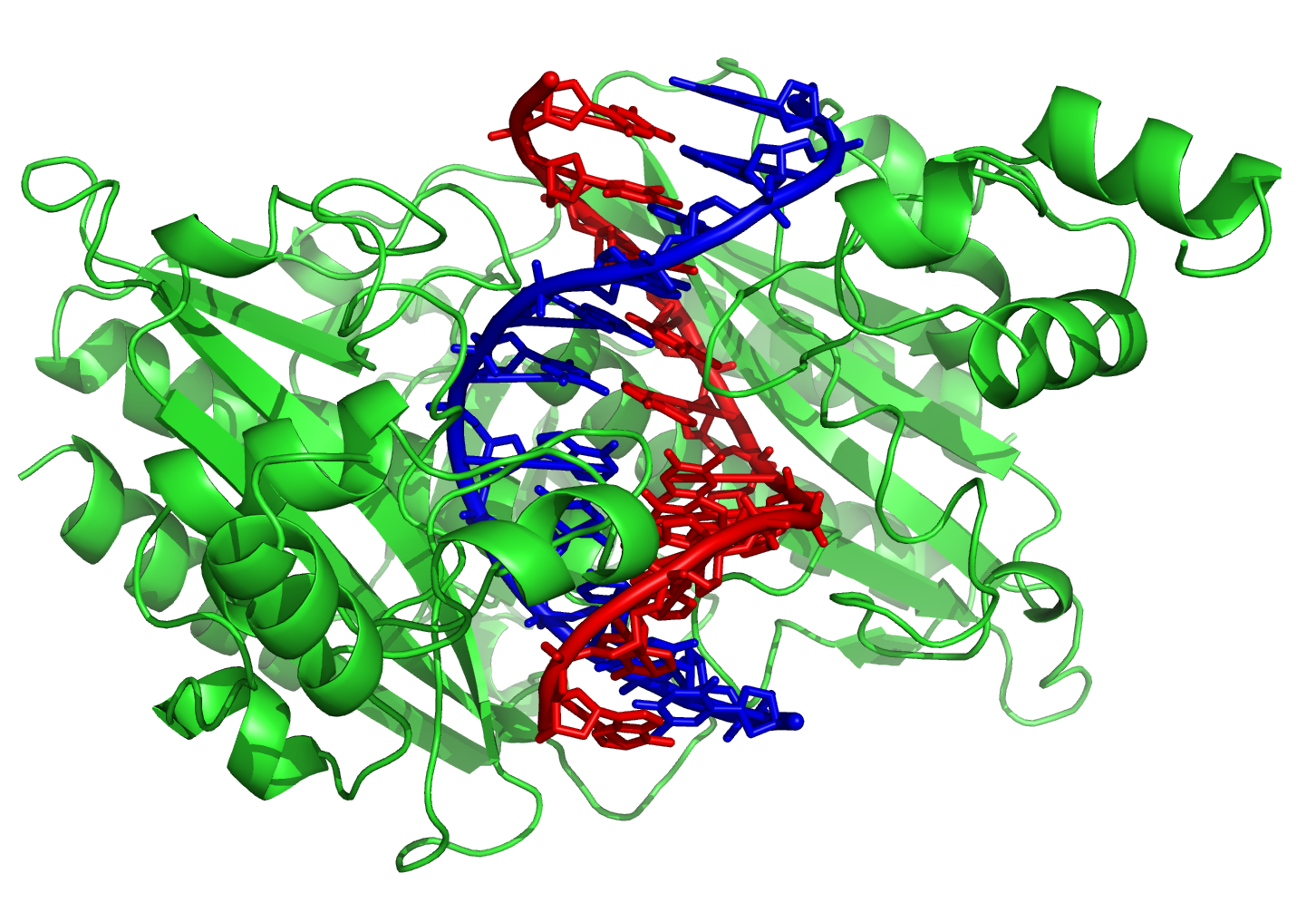
The restriction enzyme EcoRV (green) in a complex with its substrate DNA

Nucleases are enzymes that cut DNA strands by catalyzing the hydrolysis of the phosphodiester bonds. Nucleases that hydrolyse nucleotides from the ends of DNA strands are called exonucleases, while endonucleases cut within strands. The most frequently used nucleases in molecular biology are the restriction endonucleases, which cut DNA at specific sequences. For instance, the EcoRV enzyme shown to the left recognizes the 6-base sequence 5′-GATATC-3′ and makes a cut at the horizontal line. In nature, these enzymes protect bacteria against phage infection by digesting the phage DNA when it enters the bacterial cell, acting as part of the restriction modification system. In technology, these sequence-specific nucleases are used in molecular cloning and DNA fingerprinting.

Enzymes called DNA ligases can rejoin cut or broken DNA strands. Ligases are particularly important in lagging strand DNA replication, as they join the short segments of DNA produced at the replication fork into a complete copy of the DNA template. They are also used in DNA repair and genetic recombination.

==== Topoisomerases and helicases ====
Topoisomerases are enzymes with both nuclease and ligase activity. These proteins change the amount of supercoiling in DNA. Some of these enzymes work by cutting the DNA helix and allowing one section to rotate, thereby reducing its level of supercoiling; the enzyme then seals the DNA break. Other types of these enzymes are capable of cutting one DNA helix and then passing a second strand of DNA through this break, before rejoining the helix. Topoisomerases are required for many processes involving DNA, such as DNA replication and transcription.

Helicases are proteins that are a type of molecular motor. They use the chemical energy in nucleoside triphosphates, predominantly adenosine triphosphate (ATP), to break hydrogen bonds between bases and unwind the DNA double helix into single strands. These enzymes are essential for most processes where enzymes need to access the DNA bases.

==== Polymerases ====
Polymerases are enzymes that synthesize polynucleotide chains from nucleoside triphosphates. The sequence of their products is created based on existing polynucleotide chains—which are called templates. These enzymes function by repeatedly adding a nucleotide to the 3′ hydroxyl group at the end of the growing polynucleotide chain. As a consequence, all polymerases work in a 5′ to 3′ direction. In the active site of these enzymes, the incoming nucleoside triphosphate base-pairs to the template: this allows polymerases to accurately synthesize the complementary strand of their template. Polymerases are classified according to the type of template that they use.

In DNA replication, DNA-dependent DNA polymerases make copies of DNA polynucleotide chains. To preserve biological information, it is essential that the sequence of bases in each copy are precisely complementary to the sequence of bases in the template strand. Many DNA polymerases have a proofreading activity. Here, the polymerase recognizes the occasional mistakes in the synthesis reaction by the lack of base pairing between the mismatched nucleotides. If a mismatch is detected, a 3′ to 5′ exonuclease activity is activated and the incorrect base removed. In most organisms, DNA polymerases function in a large complex called the replisome that contains multiple accessory subunits, such as the DNA clamp or helicases.

RNA-dependent DNA polymerases are a specialized class of polymerases that copy the sequence of an RNA strand into DNA. They include reverse transcriptase, which is a viral enzyme involved in the infection of cells by retroviruses, and telomerase, which is required for the replication of telomeres. For example, HIV reverse transcriptase is an enzyme for AIDS virus replication. Telomerase is an unusual polymerase because it contains its own RNA template as part of its structure. It synthesizes telomeres at the ends of chromosomes. Telomeres prevent fusion of the ends of neighboring chromosomes and protect chromosome ends from damage.

Transcription is carried out by a DNA-dependent RNA polymerase that copies the sequence of a DNA strand into RNA. To begin transcribing a gene, the RNA polymerase binds to a sequence of DNA called a promoter and separates the DNA strands. It then copies the gene sequence into a messenger RNA transcript until it reaches a region of DNA called the terminator, where it halts and detaches from the DNA. As with human DNA-dependent DNA polymerases, RNA polymerase II, the enzyme that transcribes most of the genes in the human genome, operates as part of a large protein complex with multiple regulatory and accessory subunits.

== Genetic recombination ==
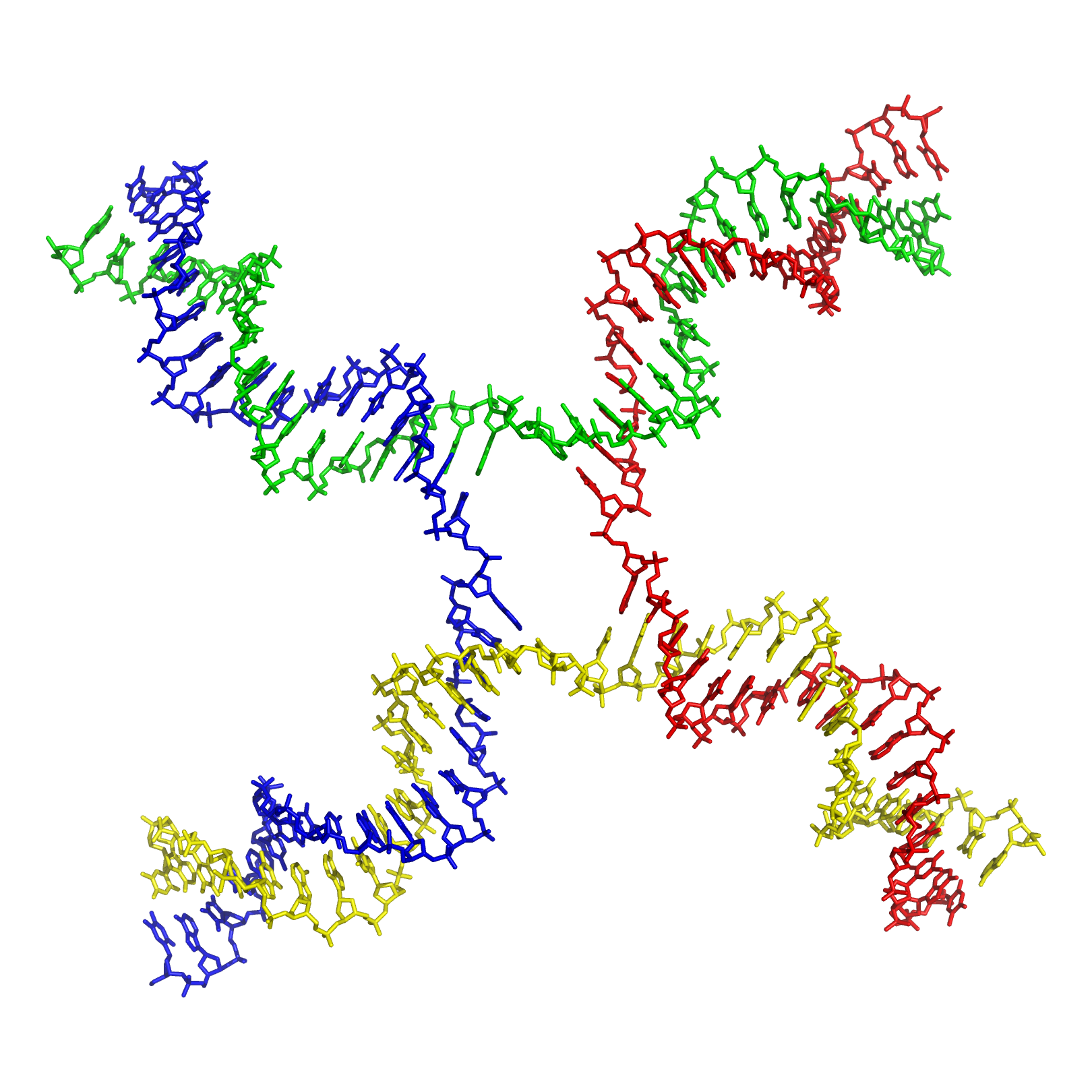

Structure of the Holliday junction intermediate in genetic recombination. The four separate DNA strands are coloured red, blue, green and yellow.

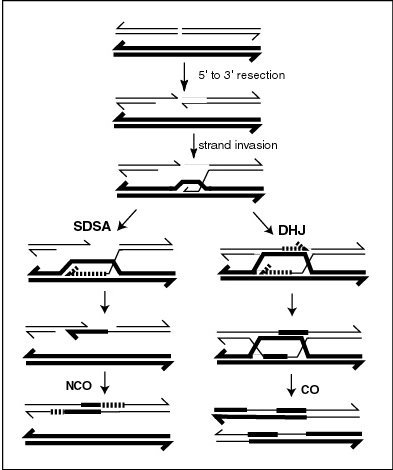
A current model of meiotic recombination, initiated by a double-strand break or gap, followed by pairing with an homologous chromosome and strand invasion to initiate the recombinational repair process. Repair of the gap can lead to crossover (CO) or non-crossover (NCO) of the flanking regions. CO recombination is thought to occur by the Double Holliday Junction (DHJ) model, illustrated on the right, above. NCO recombinants are thought to occur primarily by the Synthesis Dependent Strand Annealing (SDSA) model, illustrated on the left, above. Most recombination events appear to be the SDSA type.

A DNA helix usually does not interact with other segments of DNA, and in human cells, the different chromosomes even occupy separate areas in the nucleus called "chromosome territories". This physical separation of different chromosomes is important for the ability of DNA to function as a stable repository for information, as one of the few times chromosomes interact is in chromosomal crossover which occurs during sexual reproduction, when genetic recombination occurs. Chromosomal crossover is when two DNA helices break, swap a section and then rejoin.

Recombination allows chromosomes to exchange genetic information and produces new combinations of genes, which increases the efficiency of natural selection and can be important in the rapid evolution of new proteins. Genetic recombination can also be involved in DNA repair, particularly in the cell's response to double-strand breaks.

The most common form of chromosomal crossover is homologous recombination, where the two chromosomes involved share very similar sequences. Non-homologous recombination can be damaging to cells, as it can produce chromosomal translocations and genetic abnormalities. The recombination reaction is catalyzed by enzymes known as recombinases, such as RAD51. The first step in recombination is a double-stranded break caused by either an endonuclease or damage to the DNA. A series of steps catalyzed in part by the recombinase then leads to joining of the two helices by at least one Holliday junction, in which a segment of a single strand in each helix is annealed to the complementary strand in the other helix. The Holliday junction is a tetrahedral junction structure that can be moved along the pair of chromosomes, swapping one strand for another. The recombination reaction is then halted by cleavage of the junction and re-ligation of the released DNA. Only strands of like polarity exchange DNA during recombination. There are two types of cleavage: east–west cleavage and north–south cleavage. The north–south cleavage nicks both strands of DNA, while the east–west cleavage has one strand of DNA intact. The formation of a Holliday junction during recombination makes it possible for genetic diversity, genes to exchange on chromosomes, and expression of wild-type viral genomes.

== Evolution ==
DNA contains the genetic information that allows all forms of life to function, grow and reproduce. However, it is unclear how long in the 4-billion-year history of life DNA has performed this function, as it has been proposed that the earliest forms of life may have used RNA as their genetic material. RNA may have acted as the central part of early cell metabolism as it can both transmit genetic information and carry out catalysis as part of ribozymes. This ancient RNA world where nucleic acid would have been used for both catalysis and genetics may have influenced the evolution of the current genetic code based on four nucleotide bases. This would occur, since the number of different bases in such an organism is a trade-off between a small number of bases increasing replication accuracy and a large number of bases increasing the catalytic efficiency of ribozymes. However, there is no direct evidence of ancient genetic systems, as recovery of DNA from most fossils is impossible because DNA survives in the environment for less than one million years, and slowly degrades into short fragments in solution. Claims for older DNA have been made, most notably a report of the isolation of a viable bacterium from a salt crystal 250 million years old, but these claims are controversial.

Building blocks of DNA (adenine, guanine, and related organic molecules) may have been formed extraterrestrially in outer space. Complex DNA and RNA organic compounds of life, including uracil, cytosine, and thymine, have also been formed in the laboratory under conditions mimicking those found in outer space, using starting chemicals, such as pyrimidine, found in meteorites. Pyrimidine, like polycyclic aromatic hydrocarbons (PAHs), the most carbon-rich chemical found in the universe, may have been formed in red giants or in interstellar cosmic dust and gas clouds.

Ancient DNA has been recovered from ancient organisms at a timescale where genome evolution can be directly observed, including from extinct organisms up to millions of years old, such as the woolly mammoth.

== Uses in technology ==
=== Genetic engineering ===
Methods have been developed to purify DNA from organisms, such as phenol-chloroform extraction, and to manipulate it in the laboratory, such as restriction digests and the polymerase chain reaction. Modern biology and biochemistry make intensive use of these techniques in recombinant DNA technology. Recombinant DNA is a man-made DNA sequence that has been assembled from other DNA sequences. They can be transformed into organisms in the form of plasmids or in the appropriate format, by using a viral vector. The genetically modified organisms produced can be used to produce products such as recombinant proteins, used in medical research, or be grown in agriculture.

=== DNA profiling ===
Forensic scientists can use DNA in blood, semen, skin, saliva or hair found at a crime scene to identify a matching DNA of an individual, such as a perpetrator. This process is formally termed DNA profiling, also called DNA fingerprinting. In DNA profiling, the lengths of variable sections of repetitive DNA, such as short tandem repeats and minisatellites, are compared between people. This method is usually an extremely reliable technique for identifying a matching DNA. However, identification can be complicated if the scene is contaminated with DNA from several people. DNA profiling was developed in 1984 by British geneticist Sir Alec Jeffreys, and first used in forensic science to convict Colin Pitchfork in the 1988 Enderby murders case.

The development of forensic science and the ability to now obtain genetic matching on minute samples of blood, skin, saliva, or hair has led to re-examining many cases. Evidence can now be uncovered that was scientifically impossible at the time of the original examination. Combined with the removal of the double jeopardy law in some places, this can allow cases to be reopened where prior trials have failed to produce sufficient evidence to convince a jury. People charged with serious crimes may be required to provide a sample of DNA for matching purposes. The most obvious defense to DNA matches obtained forensically is to claim that cross-contamination of evidence has occurred. This has resulted in meticulous strict handling procedures with new cases of serious crime.

DNA profiling is also used successfully to positively identify victims of mass casualty incidents, bodies or body parts in serious accidents, and individual victims in mass war graves, via matching to family members.

DNA profiling is also used in DNA paternity testing to determine if someone is the biological parent or grandparent of a child with the probability of parentage is typically 99.99% when the alleged parent is biologically related to the child. Usually DNA sequencing are carried out after birth, but there are new methods to test paternity while a mother is still pregnant.

=== DNA enzymes or catalytic DNA ===
Deoxyribozymes, also called DNAzymes or catalytic DNA, were first discovered in 1994. They are mostly single stranded DNA sequences isolated from a large pool of random DNA sequences through a combinatorial approach called in vitro selection or systematic evolution of ligands by exponential enrichment (SELEX). DNAzymes catalyze variety of chemical reactions including RNA-DNA cleavage, RNA-DNA ligation, amino acids phosphorylation-dephosphorylation, carbon-carbon bond formation, etc. DNAzymes can enhance catalytic rate of chemical reactions up to 100,000,000,000-fold over the uncatalyzed reaction. The most extensively studied class of DNAzymes is RNA-cleaving types which have been used to detect different metal ions and designing therapeutic agents. Several metal-specific DNAzymes have been reported including the GR-5 DNAzyme (lead-specific), the CA1-3 DNAzymes (copper-specific), the 39E DNAzyme (uranyl-specific) and the NaA43 DNAzyme (sodium-specific). The NaA43 DNAzyme, which is reported to be more than 10,000-fold selective for sodium over other metal ions, was used to make a real-time sodium sensor in cells.

=== Bioinformatics ===
Bioinformatics involves the development of techniques to store, data mine, search and manipulate biological data, including DNA nucleic acid sequence data. These have led to widely applied advances in computer science, especially string searching algorithms, machine learning, and database theory. String searching or matching algorithms, which find an occurrence of a sequence of letters inside a larger sequence of letters, were developed to search for specific sequences of nucleotides. The DNA sequence may be aligned with other DNA sequences to identify homologous sequences and locate the specific mutations that make them distinct. These techniques, especially multiple sequence alignment, are used in studying phylogenetic relationships and protein function. Data sets representing entire genomes' worth of DNA sequences, such as those produced by the Human Genome Project, are difficult to use without the annotations that identify the locations of genes and regulatory elements on each chromosome. Regions of DNA sequence that have the characteristic patterns associated with protein- or RNA-coding genes can be identified by gene finding algorithms, which allow researchers to predict the presence of particular gene products and their possible functions in an organism even before they have been isolated experimentally. Entire genomes may also be compared, which can shed light on the evolutionary history of particular organism and permit the examination of complex evolutionary events.

=== DNA nanotechnology ===
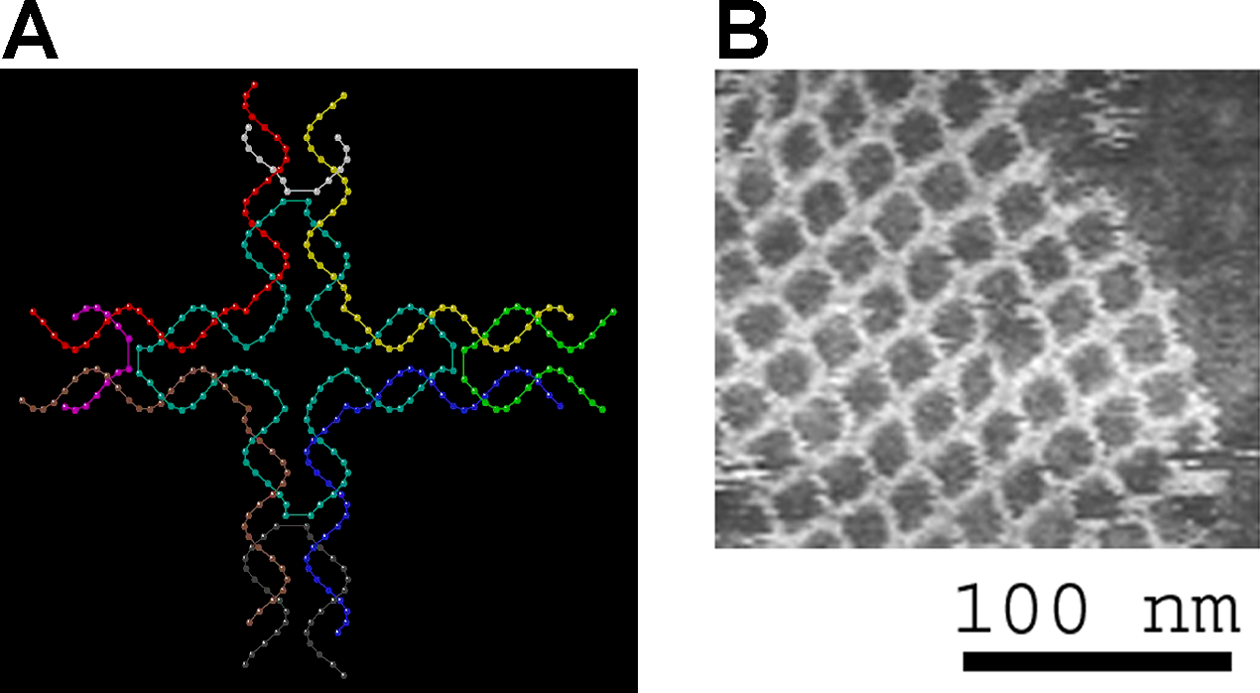
The DNA structure at left (schematic shown) will self-assemble into the structure visualized by atomic force microscopy at right. DNA nanotechnology is the field that seeks to design nanoscale structures using the molecular recognition properties of DNA molecules.

DNA nanotechnology uses the unique molecular recognition properties of DNA and other nucleic acids to create self-assembling branched DNA complexes with useful properties. DNA is thus used as a structural material rather than as a carrier of biological information. This has led to the creation of two-dimensional periodic lattices (both tile-based and using the DNA origami method) and three-dimensional structures in the shapes of polyhedra. Nanomechanical devices and algorithmic self-assembly have also been demonstrated, and these DNA structures have been used to template the arrangement of other molecules such as gold nanoparticles and streptavidin proteins. DNA and other nucleic acids are the basis of aptamers, synthetic oligonucleotide ligands for specific target molecules used in a range of biotechnology and biomedical applications.

=== History and anthropology ===
Because DNA collects mutations over time, which are then inherited, it contains historical information, and, by comparing DNA sequences, geneticists can infer the evolutionary history of organisms, their phylogeny. This field of phylogenetics is a powerful tool in evolutionary biology. If DNA sequences within a species are compared, population geneticists can learn the history of particular populations. This can be used in studies ranging from ecological genetics to anthropology.

=== Information storage ===
DNA as a storage device for information has enormous potential since it has much higher storage density compared to electronic devices. However, high costs, slow read and write times (memory latency), and insufficient reliability has prevented its practical use.

== History ==
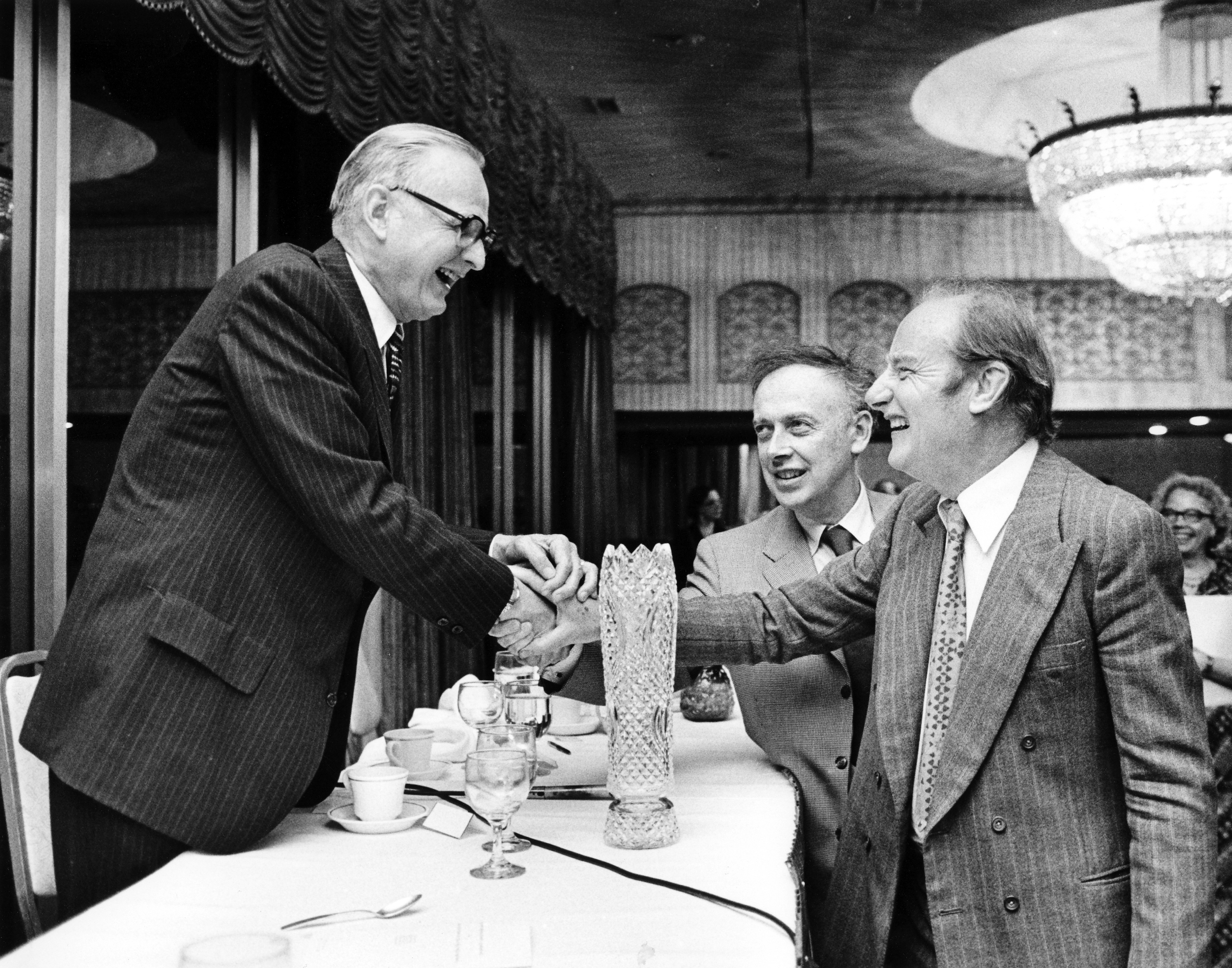
Maclyn McCarty (left) shakes hands with Francis Crick and James Watson, co-originators of the double-helix model based on the X-ray diffraction data and insights of Rosalind Franklin and Raymond Gosling.

DNA was first isolated by the Swiss physician Friedrich Miescher who, in 1869, discovered a microscopic substance in the pus of discarded surgical bandages. As it resided in the nuclei of cells, he called it "nuclein". In 1878, Albrecht Kossel isolated the non-protein component of "nuclein", nucleic acid, and later isolated its five primary nucleobases.

In 1909, Phoebus Levene identified the base, sugar, and phosphate nucleotide unit of RNA (then named "yeast nucleic acid"). In 1929, Levene identified deoxyribose sugar in "thymus nucleic acid" (DNA). Levene suggested that DNA consisted of a string of four nucleotide units linked together through the phosphate groups ("Tetranucleotide hypothesis"). Levene thought the chain was short and the bases repeated in a fixed order. In 1927, Nikolai Koltsov proposed that inherited traits would be inherited via a "giant hereditary molecule" made up of "two mirror strands that would replicate in a semi-conservative fashion using each strand as a template". In 1928, Frederick Griffith in his experiment discovered that traits of the "smooth" form of Pneumococcus could be transferred to the "rough" form of the same bacteria by mixing killed "smooth" bacteria with the live "rough" form. This system provided the first clear suggestion that DNA carries genetic information.

In 1933, while studying virgin sea urchin eggs, Jean Brachet suggested that DNA is found in the cell nucleus and that RNA is present exclusively in the cytoplasm. At the time, "yeast nucleic acid" (RNA) was thought to occur only in plants, while "thymus nucleic acid" (DNA) only in animals. The latter was thought to be a tetramer, with the function of buffering cellular pH. In 1937, William Astbury produced the first X-ray diffraction patterns that showed that DNA had a regular structure.

In 1943, Oswald Avery, along with co-workers Colin MacLeod and Maclyn McCarty, identified DNA as the transforming principle, supporting Griffith's suggestion (Avery–MacLeod–McCarty experiment). Erwin Chargaff developed and published observations now known as Chargaff's rules, stating that in DNA from any species of any organism, the amount of guanine should be equal to cytosine and the amount of adenine should be equal to thymine.

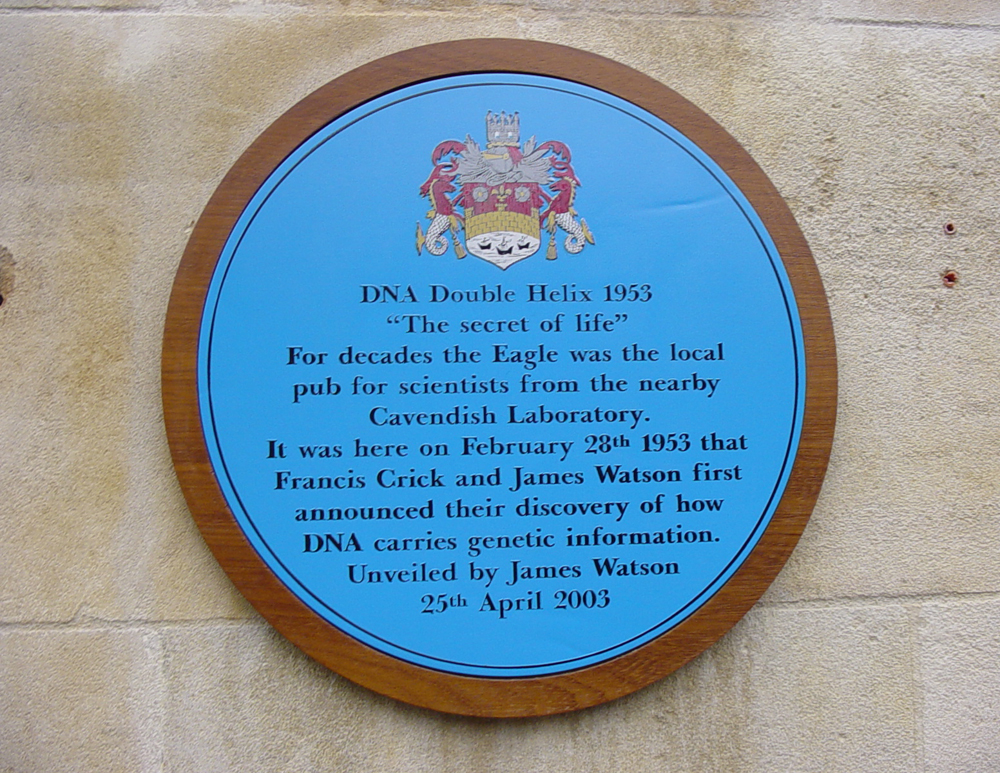
A blue plaque outside The Eagle pub in Cambridge, England commemorating Crick and Watson

By 1951, Alec Todd and collaborators at the University of Cambridge had determined by biochemical methods how the backbone of DNA is structured via the successive linking of carbon atoms 3 and 5 of the sugar to phosphates. This would help to corroborate Watson and Crick's later X-ray structural work. Todd would later be awarded the 1957 Nobel Prize in Chemistry for this and other discoveries related to DNA.

Late in 1951, Francis Crick started working with James Watson at the Cavendish Laboratory within the University of Cambridge. DNA's role in heredity was confirmed in 1952 when Alfred Hershey and Martha Chase in the Hershey–Chase experiment showed that DNA is the genetic material of the enterobacteria phage T2.

Photo 51, showing X-ray diffraction pattern of DNA

In May 1952, Raymond Gosling, a graduate student working under the supervision of Rosalind Franklin, took an X-ray diffraction image, labeled as "Photo 51", at high hydration levels of DNA. This photo was given to Watson and Crick by Maurice Wilkins and was critical to their obtaining the correct structure of DNA. Franklin told Crick and Watson that the backbones had to be on the outside. Before then, Linus Pauling, and Watson and Crick, had erroneous models with the chains inside and the bases pointing outwards. Franklin's identification of the space group for DNA crystals proved her correct. In February 1953, Linus Pauling and Robert Corey proposed a model for nucleic acids containing three intertwined chains, with the phosphates near the axis, and the bases on the outside. Watson and Crick completed their model, which is now accepted as the first correct model of the double helix of DNA. On 28 February 1953 Crick interrupted patrons' lunchtime at The Eagle pub in Cambridge, England to announce that he and Watson had "discovered the secret of life".

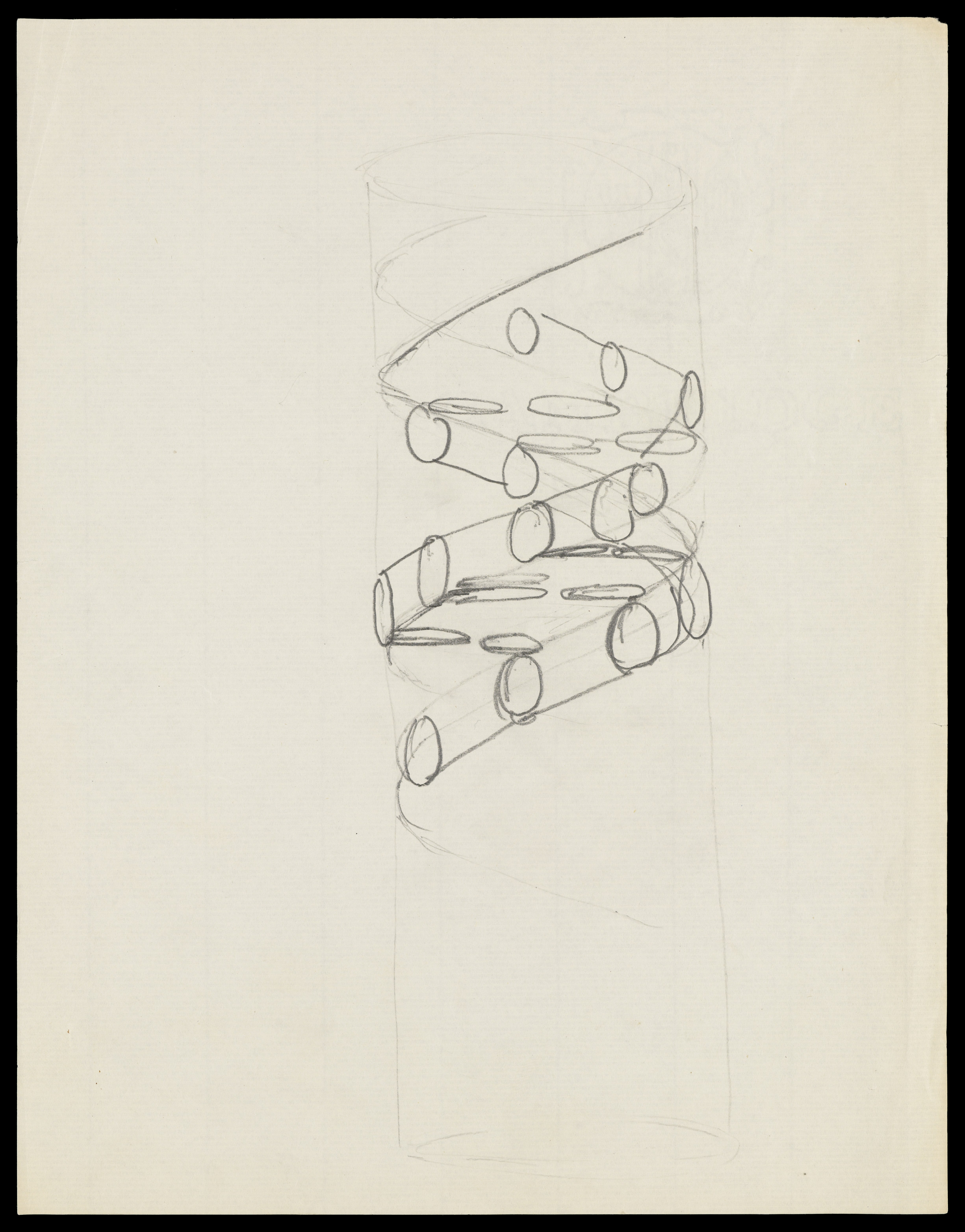
Pencil sketch of the DNA double helix by Francis Crick in 1953

The 25 April 1953 issue of the journal Nature published a series of five articles giving the Watson and Crick double-helix structure DNA and evidence supporting it. The structure was reported in a letter in which they stated, "It has not escaped our notice that the specific pairing we have postulated immediately suggests a possible copying mechanism for the genetic material." This letter was followed by a letter from Franklin and Gosling, which was the first publication of their own X-ray diffraction data and of their original analysis method. Then followed a letter by Wilkins and two of his colleagues, which contained an analysis of in vivo B-DNA X-ray patterns, and which supported the presence in vivo of the Watson and Crick structure.

In April 2023, scientists, based on new evidence, concluded that Rosalind Franklin was a contributor and "equal player" in the discovery process of DNA, rather than otherwise, as may have been presented subsequently after the time of the discovery. In 1962, after Franklin's death, Watson, Crick, and Wilkins jointly received the Nobel Prize in Physiology or Medicine. Nobel Prizes are awarded only to living recipients. A debate continues about who should receive credit for the discovery.

In an influential presentation in 1957, Crick laid out the central dogma of molecular biology, which foretold the relationship between DNA, RNA, and proteins, and articulated the "adaptor hypothesis". Final confirmation of the replication mechanism that was implied by the double-helical structure followed in 1958 through the Meselson–Stahl experiment. Further work by Crick and co-workers showed that the genetic code was based on non-overlapping triplets of bases, called codons, allowing Har Gobind Khorana, Robert W. Holley, and Marshall Warren Nirenberg to decipher the genetic code. These findings represent the birth of molecular biology.

In 1986, DNA analysis was first used in a criminal investigation when police in the UK requested Alec Jeffreys of the University of Leicester to prove or disprove the involvement in a particular case of a suspect who claimed innocence in the matter. Although the suspect had already confessed to committing a recent rape-murder, he was denying any involvement in a similar crime committed three years earlier. Yet the details of the two cases were so alike that the police concluded both crimes had been committed by the same person. However, all charges against the suspect were dropped when Jeffreys' DNA testing exonerated the suspect—from both the earlier murder and the one to which he'd confessed. Further such DNA profiling led to positive identification of another suspect (Colin Pitchfork) who, in 1988, was found guilty of both rape-murders.

== See also ==
- Autosome – Any chromosome other than a sex chromosome
- Crystallography – Scientific study of crystal structures
- DNA Day – Holiday celebrated on April 25
- DNA microarray – Collection of microscopic DNA spots attached to a solid surface
- DNA sequencing – Process of determining the nucleic acid sequence
- Environmental DNA – DNA sampled from the environment rather than directly from an individual organism
- Genetic code – Rules by which information encoded within genetic material is translated into proteins
- Genetic disorder – Health problem from genome abnormalities
- Genetic genealogy – DNA testing to infer relationships
- Haplotype – Group of genes from one parent
- Meiosis – Cell division producing haploid gametes
- Nucleic acid notation – Universal notation of DNA nucleotides
- Nucleic acid sequence – Succession of nucleotides in a nucleic acid
- Proteopedia Forms_of_DNA
- DNA Replication – Biological process
- Ribosomal DNA – Genes coding for ribosomal RNA
- Southern blot – DNA analysis technique
- Transcription (biology) – Process of copying a segment of DNA into RNA
- X-ray scattering techniques – Family of analytical techniques
- Xeno nucleic acid – Synthetic nucleic acid analogues
