= Imre Festetics =

Hungarian scientist (1764–1847)

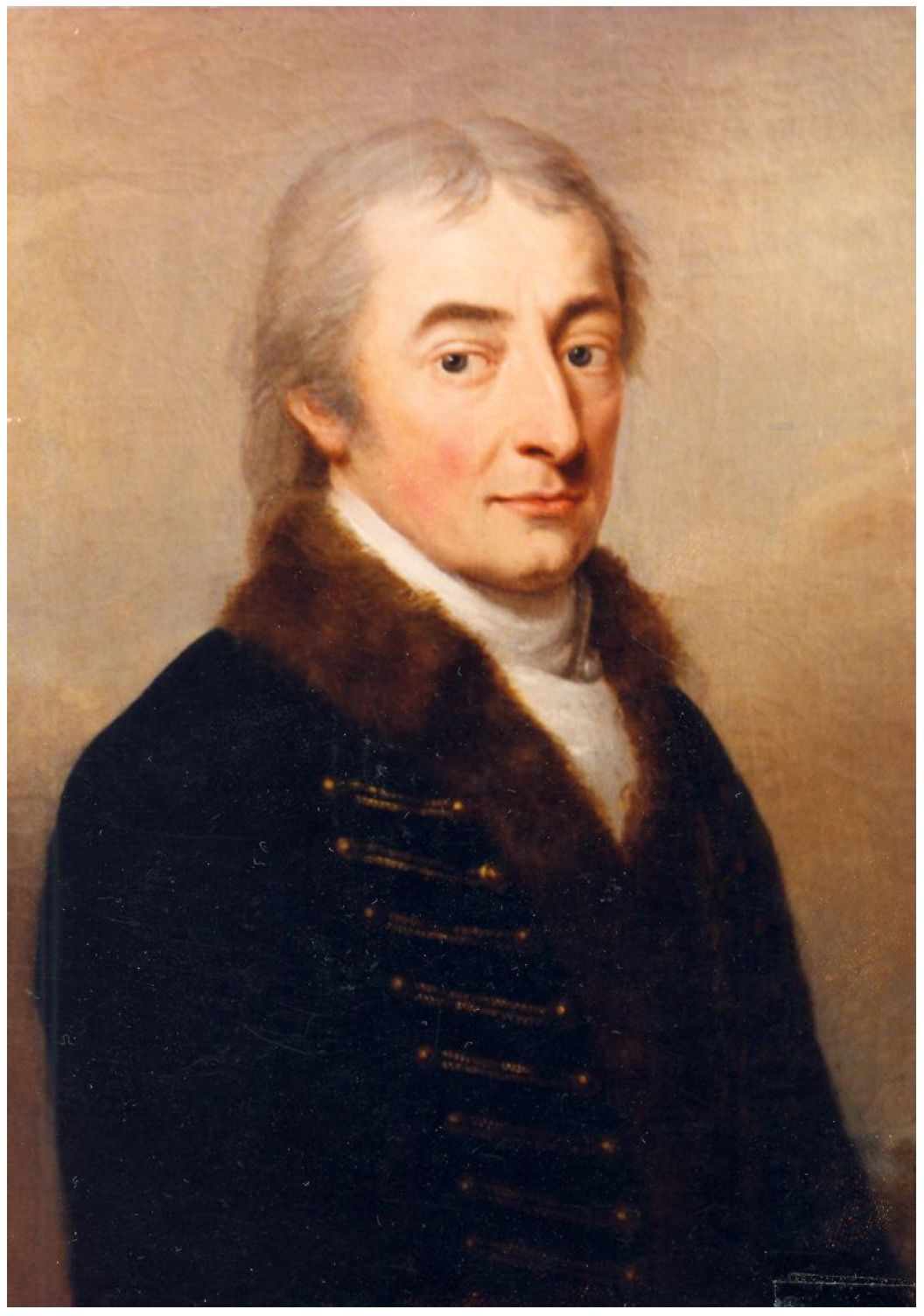
- Born: Imre (Emmerich) Festetics; 1764; Simaság, Habsburg monarchy
- Died: 1847 (aged 82–83); Kőszeg, Austrian Empire
- Known for: Creating the science of genetics
- Scientific career
- Fields: Genetics

Count Imre Festetics de Tolna, Germanized as Emmerich Festetics, /feʃtetɪtʃ/ (2 October 1764 – 1 April 1847) was a Hungarian noble, sheep breeder, and pioneer geneticist. He is known for coining the term "genetics". In 1817 he exhibited a sheep breed called Mimush that he had developed through inbreeding and selection for specific characters. In 1819 he introduced the phrases künstliche Zuchtwahl (or artificial selection) and "die genetischen Gesetze der Natur" (the genetic laws of nature).

== Biography ==
Festetics was born in noble family of Tolna in the family's castle in Ság (now Simaság). His father Count Pál Festetics (1722-1782) of Tolna was a court councillor. His mother was Júlia Bossányi, who took an interest in his education, with home tutor Jeromos Nagy teaching him German, Latin, and history. His brother Count György Festetics (1755-1819) would later found the Georgikon, a centre for agricultural education, in Keszthely in 1797. In 1782 he served in the Levenehr light cavalry regiment seeing action against Turks. Wounded in Bucharest, he resigned after eight years in 1790. Along with his brother György he travelled to England where he examined sheep breeding. He married Krisztina Boronkay (1774–1807) in 1791 and they had three children. He began to breed sheep from around 1803 and had access to a vast library consisting of nearly 80,000 books. He married Borbála Vízkeleti in 1812 and they lived in a palace in Kőszeg.

== Scientific works ==
Many of the central principles the discipline of genetics were formulated by Festetics through the study of sheep. Festetics formulated a number of rules of heredity and was the first to refer to these as "genetic laws of nature" (Die genetischen Gesetze der Natur). In so doing he used the term genetic for the first time, 80 years before William Bateson did so in his personal letter to Adam Sedgwick. Festetics created this new term to clearly distinguish his rules of heredity, or genetic laws, from the physiological laws of Ehrenfels.

=== Genetic Laws of Nature ===
1. Healthy plants and robust animals are able to propagate and inherit their specific characteristics.
2. Traits of grandparents that are different from those of the immediate progeny may reappear in later generations.
3. Animals possessing desirable traits that have been inherited over many generations can sometimes have offspring with divergent traits. Such progeny are variants or freaks of nature, and are unsuitable for further propagation if the aim is the heredity of specific traits.
4. A precondition for successful application of inbreeding is scrupulous selection of stock animals.

In these Genetic Laws, Festetics was the first to recognize empirically the segregation of characters in the second hybrid generation. He also linked heredity (vererbung) with health and vigor independently of external factors, stressing the role of inbreeding (combined with strong selection) in stabilizing character inheritance for preserving or developing new races. To illustrate the concept he used sheep, chicken, cattle and horse breeds as examples, although he also applied it to the human species by considering populations of isolated Hungarian villages, in which he had observed degenerative mental and physical characteristics. Festetics's observations highlighted important correlations between variability, adaptation, and development. He also noted the consequences of selection and its role in heredity, believing that variability and his postulated laws of genetics were connected, acting together in breeding as well as in the natural processes controlling populations of different animals, including humans.

Festetics, however, was ultimately hindered by the complex nature of his study traits, aspects of wool quality that are now known to be polygenic.

When Gregor Mendel turned his attention to inheritance in peas he was just the latest in a line of Moravian researchers and agriculturalists who had been thinking about inheritance, and many of the principles had already been sketched out by Festetics.

He is also considered the founders of classical ethology, being the first to describe instinctive behaviour, in his ethogram of sheep.

=== Publications ===
Festetics original publications include:

- Festetics, Imre. 1815. Híradás a juhtenyésztés jobbítását és pallérozását óhajtó hazafiakhoz [A call on patriots eager to improve and cultivate sheep breeding]. Nemzeti Gazda 10: 145–147.
- Festetics, Emmerich. 1815. Aus einem Schreiben des Herrn Grafen Emmerich Festetics zu Güns in Ungarn. Oekonomische Neuigkeiten und Verhandlungen 69: 547–548.
- Festetics, Emmerich. 1818. Ueber die Emporbringung des Ackerbaues mittelst Erweiterung der Schafzucht. Oekonomische Neuigkeiten und Verhandlungen 69: 547–552.
- Festetics, Emmerich. 1819. Erklärung des Herrn Grafen Emmerich von Festetics. (Vergleichen Nr. 38, 39. u. 55, 1818). Oekonomische Neuigkeiten und Verhandlungen 2: 9–12.
- Festetics, Emmerich. 1819. Erklärung des Herrn Grafen Emmerich von Festetics. Oekonomische Neuigkeiten und Verhandlungen 3: 18–20.
- Festetics, Emmerich. 1819. Weitere Erklärung des Herrn Grafen Emmerich Festetics Ueber Inzucht. Oekonomische Neuigkeiten und Verhandlungen 22: 169–170.
- Festetics, Emmerich. 1820. Äuserung des Herrn Grafen Festetics. Oekonomische Neuigkeiten und Verhandlungen 15(20): 115–119.
- Festetics, Emmerich. 1820. Bericht des Herrn Emmerich Festetics als Repräsentanten des Schafzüchter-Vereins im Eisenburger Comitate. Oekonomische Neuigkeiten und Verhandlungen 4(19): 25–27.
- Festetics, Emmerich. 1822. Über einen Aufsatz des Hrn. I. R. in 3ten Hefte des Jahrganges 1821. Oekonomische Neuigkeiten und Verhandlungen 92: 729–731.

== Other sources ==
- Die genetische Gesätze der Natur. Oekonomische Neuigkeiten und Verhandlungen, 1819.
- Szabo´ A.T. (2009) Phaseolus as a model taxon for monitoring trends in European home garden diversity: a methodological approach and proposal. Bailey A, Eyzaguirre P, Maggioni L, editors. Crop genetic resources in European home gardens. Proceedings of a Workshop, 3–4 October 2007, Ljubljana, Slovenia. Rome: Biodiversity International (IPGRI) Press. pp. 37–54.
