= Genetics =

Science of genes, heredity and variation

Genetics is the study of genes, genetic variation, and heredity in organisms. It is an important branch in biology because heredity is vital to organisms' evolution. Gregor Mendel, a Moravian Augustinian friar working in the 19th century in Brno, was the first to study genetics scientifically. Mendel studied "trait inheritance", patterns in the way traits are handed down from parents to offspring over time. He observed that organisms (pea plants) inherit traits by way of discrete "units of inheritance". This term, still used today, is a somewhat ambiguous definition of what is referred to as a gene.

Trait inheritance and molecular inheritance mechanisms of genes are still primary principles of genetics in the 21st century, but modern genetics has expanded to study the function and behavior of genes. Gene structure and function, variation, and distribution are studied within the context of the cell, the organism (e.g. dominance), and within the context of a population. Genetics has given rise to a number of subfields, including molecular genetics, epigenetics, population genetics, and paleogenetics. Organisms studied within the broad field span the domains of life (archaea, bacteria, and eukarya).

Genetic processes work in combination with an organism's environment and experiences to influence development and behavior, often referred to as nature versus nurture. The intracellular or extracellular environment of a living cell or organism may increase or decrease gene transcription. A classic example is two seeds of genetically identical corn, one placed in a temperate climate and one in an arid climate (lacking sufficient waterfall or rain). While the average height the two corn stalks could grow to is genetically determined, the one in the arid climate only grows to half the height of the one in the temperate climate due to lack of water and nutrients in its environment.

== Etymology ==
William Bateson coined genetics from the ancient Greek γενετικός genetikos meaning "genitive"/"generative", which in turn derives from γένεσις genesis meaning "origin".

== History ==
The observation that living things inherit traits from their parents has been used since prehistoric times to improve crop plants and animals through selective breeding. The modern science of genetics, seeking to understand this process, began with the work of the Augustinian friar Gregor Mendel in the mid-19th century.

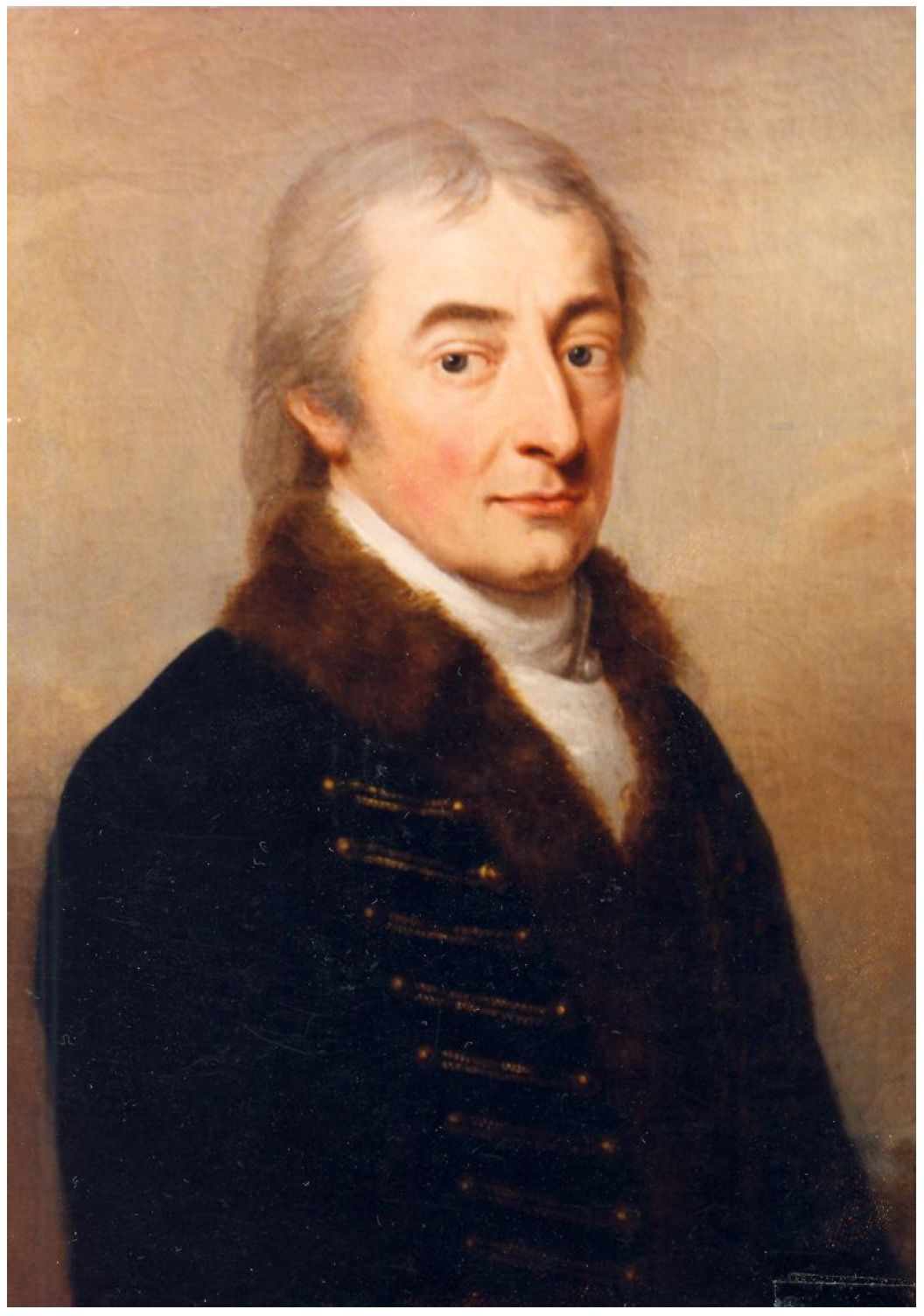
Portrait of Imre Festetics, the first geneticist and ethologist. His concepts of selection and evolution were later formulated in Charles Darwin's theory of evolution.

Prior to Mendel, Imre Festetics, a Hungarian noble, who lived in Kőszeg before Mendel, was the first who used the word "genetic" in hereditarian context, and is considered the first geneticist. He described several rules of biological inheritance in his work The genetic laws of nature (Die genetischen Gesetze der Natur, 1819). His second law is the same as that which Mendel published. In his third law, he developed the basic principles of mutation (he can be considered a forerunner of Hugo de Vries). Festetics argued that changes observed in the generation of farm animals, plants, and humans are the result of scientific laws. Festetics empirically deduced that organisms inherit their characteristics, not acquire them. He recognized recessive traits and inherent variation by postulating that traits of past generations could reappear later, and organisms could produce progeny with different attributes. These observations represent an important prelude to Mendel's theory of particulate inheritance insofar as it features a transition of heredity from its status as myth to that of a scientific discipline, by providing a fundamental theoretical basis for genetics in the twentieth century.

Blending inheritance leads to the averaging out of every characteristic, which as the engineer Fleeming Jenkin pointed out, makes evolution by natural selection impossible.

Other theories of inheritance preceded Mendel's work. A popular theory during the 19th century, and implied by Charles Darwin's 1859 On the Origin of Species, was blending inheritance: the idea that individuals inherit a smooth blend of traits from their parents. Mendel's work provided examples where traits were definitely not blended after hybridization, showing that traits are produced by combinations of distinct genes rather than a continuous blend. Blending of traits in the progeny is now explained by the action of multiple genes with quantitative effects. Another theory that had some support at that time was the inheritance of acquired characteristics: the belief that individuals inherit traits strengthened by their parents. This theory (commonly associated with Jean-Baptiste Lamarck) is now known to be wrong—the experiences of individuals do not affect the genes they pass to their children. Other theories included Darwin's pangenesis (which had both acquired and inherited aspects) and Francis Galton's reformulation of pangenesis as both particulate and inherited.

=== Mendelian genetics ===
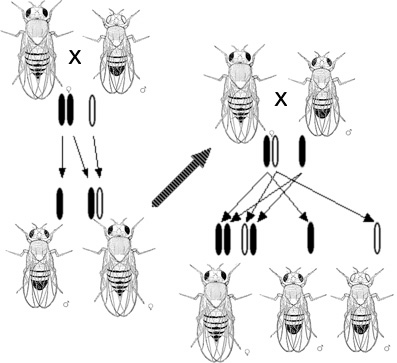
Morgan's observation of sex-linked inheritance of a mutation causing white eyes in Drosophila led him to the hypothesis that genes are located upon chromosomes.

Modern genetics started with Mendel's studies of the nature of inheritance in plants. In his paper "Versuche über Pflanzenhybriden" ("Experiments on Plant Hybridization"), presented in 1865 to the Naturforschender Verein (Society for Research in Nature) in Brno, Mendel traced the inheritance patterns of certain traits in pea plants and described them mathematically. Although this pattern of inheritance could only be observed for a few traits, Mendel's work suggested that heredity was particulate, not acquired, and that the inheritance patterns of many traits could be explained through simple rules and ratios.

The importance of Mendel's work did not gain wide understanding until 1900, after his death, when Hugo de Vries and other scientists rediscovered his research. William Bateson, a proponent of Mendel's work, coined the word genetics in 1905. The adjective genetic, derived from the Greek word genesis—γένεσις, "origin", predates the noun and was first used in a biological sense in 1860. Bateson both acted as a mentor and was aided significantly by the work of other scientists from Newnham College at Cambridge, specifically the work of Becky Saunders, Nora Darwin Barlow, and Muriel Wheldale Onslow. Bateson popularized the usage of the word genetics to describe the study of inheritance in his inaugural address to the Third International Conference on Plant Hybridization in London in 1906.

After the rediscovery of Mendel's work, scientists tried to determine which molecules in the cell were responsible for inheritance. In 1900, Nettie Stevens began studying the mealworm. Over the next 11 years, she discovered that females only had the X chromosome and males had both X and Y chromosomes. She was able to conclude that sex is a chromosomal factor and is determined by the male. In 1911, Thomas Hunt Morgan argued that genes are on chromosomes, based on observations of a sex-linked white eye mutation in fruit flies. In 1913, his student Alfred Sturtevant used the phenomenon of genetic linkage to show that genes are arranged linearly on the chromosome.

=== Molecular genetics ===
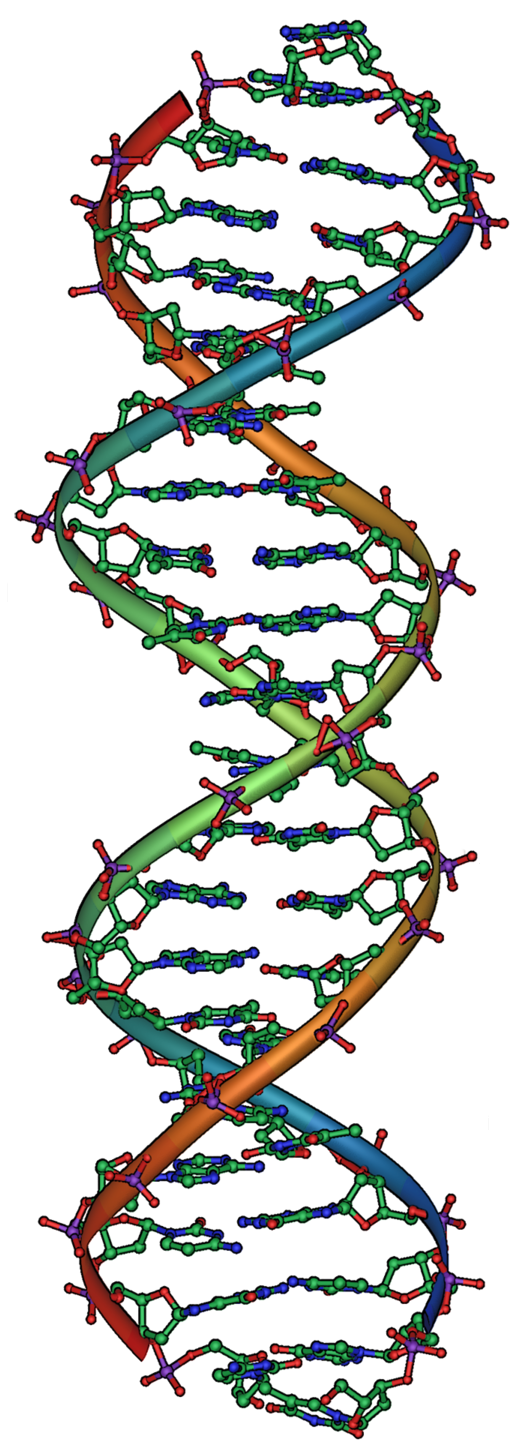
DNA, the molecular basis for biological inheritance. Each strand of DNA is a chain of nucleotides, matching each other in the center to form what look like rungs on a twisted ladder.

Although genes were known to exist on chromosomes, chromosomes are composed of both protein and DNA, and scientists did not know which of the two was responsible for inheritance. In 1928, Frederick Griffith discovered the phenomenon of transformation: dead bacteria could transfer genetic material to "transform" other still-living bacteria. Sixteen years later, in 1944, the Avery–MacLeod–McCarty experiment identified DNA as the molecule responsible for transformation. The role of the nucleus as the repository of genetic information in eukaryotes had been established by Hämmerling in 1943 in his work on the single celled alga Acetabularia. The Hershey–Chase experiment in 1952 confirmed that DNA (rather than protein) is the genetic material of the viruses that infect bacteria, providing further evidence that DNA is the molecule responsible for inheritance.

James Watson and Francis Crick determined the structure of DNA in 1953, using the X-ray crystallography work of Rosalind Franklin and Maurice Wilkins that indicated DNA has a helical structure (i.e., shaped like a corkscrew). Their double-helix model had two strands of DNA with the nucleotides pointing inward, each matching a complementary nucleotide on the other strand to form what look like rungs on a twisted ladder. This structure showed that genetic information exists in the sequence of nucleotides on each strand of DNA. The structure also suggested a simple method for replication: if the strands are separated, new partner strands can be reconstructed for each based on the sequence of the old strand. This property is what gives DNA its semi-conservative nature where one strand of new DNA is from an original parent strand.

Although the structure of DNA showed how inheritance works, it was still not known how DNA influences the behavior of cells. In the following years, scientists tried to understand how DNA controls the process of protein production. It was discovered that the cell uses DNA as a template to create matching messenger RNA, molecules with nucleotides very similar to DNA. The nucleotide sequence of a messenger RNA is used to create an amino acid sequence in protein; this translation between nucleotide sequences and amino acid sequences is known as the genetic code.

With the newfound molecular understanding of inheritance came an explosion of research. A notable theory arose from Tomoko Ohta in 1973 with her amendment to the neutral theory of molecular evolution through publishing the nearly neutral theory of molecular evolution. In this theory, Ohta stressed the importance of natural selection and the environment to the rate at which genetic evolution occurs. One important development was chain-termination DNA sequencing in 1977 by Frederick Sanger. This technology allows scientists to read the nucleotide sequence of a DNA molecule. In 1983, Kary Banks Mullis developed the polymerase chain reaction, providing a quick way to isolate and amplify a specific section of DNA from a mixture. The efforts of the Human Genome Project, Department of Energy, NIH, and parallel private efforts by Celera Genomics led to the sequencing of the human genome in 2003.

== Features of inheritance ==
=== Discrete inheritance and Mendel's laws ===
A Punnett square depicting a cross between two pea plants heterozygous for purple (B) and white (b) blossoms

At its most fundamental level, inheritance in organisms occurs by passing discrete heritable units, called genes, from parents to offspring. This property was first observed by Gregor Mendel, who studied the segregation of heritable traits in pea plants, showing for example that flowers on a single plant were either purple or white—but never an intermediate between the two colors. The discrete versions of the same gene controlling the inherited appearance (phenotypes) are called alleles.

In the case of the pea, which is a diploid species, each individual plant has two copies of each gene, one copy inherited from each parent. Many species, including humans, have this pattern of inheritance. Diploid organisms with two copies of the same allele of a given gene are called homozygous at that gene locus, while organisms with two different alleles of a given gene are called heterozygous. The set of alleles for a given organism is called its genotype, while the observable traits of the organism are called its phenotype. When organisms are heterozygous at a gene, often one allele is called dominant as its qualities dominate the phenotype of the organism, while the other allele is called recessive as its qualities recede and are not observed. Some alleles do not have complete dominance and instead have incomplete dominance by expressing an intermediate phenotype, or codominance by expressing both alleles at once.

When a pair of organisms reproduce sexually, their offspring randomly inherit one of the two alleles from each parent. These observations of discrete inheritance and the segregation of alleles are collectively known as Mendel's first law or the Law of Segregation. However, the probability of getting one gene over the other can change due to dominant, recessive, homozygous, or heterozygous genes. For example, Mendel found that if you cross heterozygous organisms your odds of getting the dominant trait is 3:1. Real geneticists study and calculate probabilities by using theoretical probabilities, empirical probabilities, the product rule, the sum rule, and more.

=== Notation and diagrams ===
Genetic pedigree charts help track the inheritance patterns of traits.

Geneticists use diagrams and symbols to describe inheritance. A gene is represented by one or a few letters. Often a "+" symbol is used to mark the usual, non-mutant allele for a gene.

In fertilization and breeding experiments (and especially when discussing Mendel's laws) the parents are referred to as the "P" generation and the offspring as the "F1" (first filial) generation. When the F1 offspring mate with each other, the offspring are called the "F2" (second filial) generation. One of the common diagrams used to predict the result of cross-breeding is the Punnett square.

When studying human genetic diseases, geneticists often use pedigree charts to represent the inheritance of traits. These charts map the inheritance of a trait in a family tree.

=== Multiple gene interactions ===
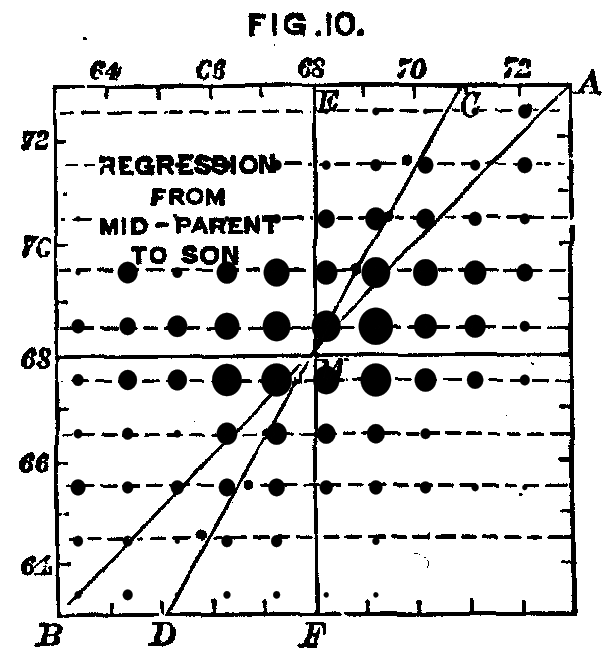
Human height is a trait with complex genetic causes. Francis Galton's data from 1889 shows the relationship between offspring height as a function of mean parent height.

Organisms have thousands of genes, and in sexually reproducing organisms these genes generally assort independently of each other. This means that the inheritance of an allele for yellow or green pea color is unrelated to the inheritance of alleles for white or purple flowers. This phenomenon, known as "Mendel's law of independent assortment", means that the alleles of different genes get shuffled between parents to form offspring with many different combinations. Different genes often interact to influence the same trait. In the Blue-eyed Mary (Omphalodes verna), for example, there exists a gene with alleles that determine the color of flowers: blue or magenta. Another gene, however, controls whether the flowers have color at all or are white. When a plant has two copies of this white allele, its flowers are white—regardless of whether the first gene has blue or magenta alleles. This interaction between genes is called epistasis, with the second gene epistatic to the first.

Many traits are not discrete features (e.g. purple or white flowers) but are instead continuous features (e.g. human height and skin color). These complex traits are products of many genes. The influence of these genes is mediated, to varying degrees, by the environment an organism has experienced. The degree to which an organism's genes contribute to a complex trait is called heritability. Measurement of the heritability of a trait is relative—in a more variable environment, the environment has a bigger influence on the total variation of the trait. For example, human height is a trait with complex causes. It has a heritability of 89% in the United States. In Nigeria, however, where people experience a more variable access to good nutrition and health care, height has a heritability of only 62%.

== Molecular basis for inheritance ==
=== DNA and chromosomes ===
The molecular structure of DNA. Bases pair through the arrangement of hydrogen bonding between the strands.

The molecular basis for genes is deoxyribonucleic acid (DNA). DNA is composed of deoxyribose (sugar molecule), a phosphate group, and a base (amine group). There are four types of bases: adenine (A), cytosine (C), guanine (G), and thymine (T). The phosphates make phosphodiester bonds with the sugars to make long phosphate-sugar backbones. Bases specifically pair together (T&A, C&G) between two backbones and make like rungs on a ladder. The bases, phosphates, and sugars together make a nucleotide that connects to make long chains of DNA. Genetic information exists in the sequence of these nucleotides, and genes exist as stretches of sequence along the DNA chain. These chains coil into a double a-helix structure and wrap around proteins called Histones which provide the structural support. DNA wrapped around these histones are called chromosomes. Viruses sometimes use the similar molecule RNA instead of DNA as their genetic material.

DNA normally exists as a double-stranded molecule, coiled into the shape of a double helix. Each nucleotide in DNA preferentially pairs with its partner nucleotide on the opposite strand: A pairs with T, and C pairs with G. Thus, in its two-stranded form, each strand effectively contains all necessary information, redundant with its partner strand. This structure of DNA is the physical basis for inheritance: DNA replication duplicates the genetic information by splitting the strands and using each strand as a template for synthesis of a new partner strand.

Schematic karyogram of a human, showing 22 homologous chromosome pairs, both the female (XX) and male (XY) versions of the sex chromosome (bottom right), as well as the mitochondrial genome (at bottom left)

Genes are arranged linearly along long chains of DNA base-pair sequences. In bacteria, each cell usually contains a single circular genophore, while eukaryotic organisms (such as plants and animals) have their DNA arranged in multiple linear chromosomes. These DNA strands are often extremely long; the largest human chromosome, for example, is about 247 million base pairs in length. The DNA of a chromosome is associated with structural proteins that organize, compact, and control access to the DNA, forming a material called chromatin; in eukaryotes, chromatin is usually composed of nucleosomes, segments of DNA wound around cores of histone proteins. The full set of hereditary material in an organism (usually the combined DNA sequences of all chromosomes) is called the genome.

DNA is most often found in the nucleus of cells, but Ruth Sager helped in the discovery of nonchromosomal genes found outside of the nucleus. In plants, these are often found in the chloroplasts and in other organisms, in the mitochondria. These nonchromosomal genes can still be passed on by either partner in sexual reproduction and they control a variety of hereditary characteristics that replicate and remain active throughout generations.

While haploid organisms have only one copy of each chromosome, most animals and many plants are diploid, containing two of each chromosome and thus two copies of every gene. The two alleles for a gene are located on identical loci of the two homologous chromosomes, each allele inherited from a different parent.

Many species have so-called sex chromosomes that determine the sex of each organism. In humans and many other animals, the Y chromosome contains the gene that triggers the development of the specifically male characteristics. In evolution, this chromosome has lost most of its content and also most of its genes, while the X chromosome is similar to the other chromosomes and contains many genes. This being said, Mary Frances Lyon discovered that there is X-chromosome inactivation during reproduction to avoid passing on twice as many genes to the offspring. Lyon's discovery led to the discovery of X-linked diseases.

=== Reproduction ===
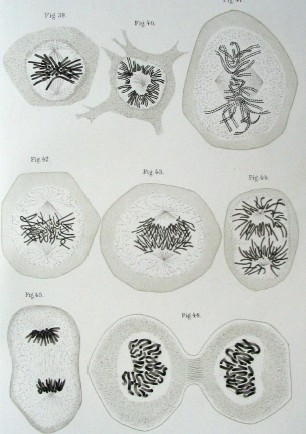
Walther Flemming's 1882 diagram of eukaryotic cell division. Chromosomes are copied, condensed, and organized. Then, as the cell divides, chromosome copies separate into the daughter cells.

When cells divide, their full genome is copied and each daughter cell inherits one copy. This process, called mitosis, is the simplest form of reproduction and is the basis for asexual reproduction. Asexual reproduction can also occur in multicellular organisms, producing offspring that inherit their genome from a single parent. Offspring that are genetically identical to their parents are called clones.

Eukaryotic organisms often use sexual reproduction to generate offspring that contain a mixture of genetic material inherited from two different parents. The process of sexual reproduction alternates between forms that contain single copies of the genome (haploid) and double copies (diploid). Haploid cells fuse and combine genetic material to create a diploid cell with paired chromosomes. Diploid organisms form haploids by dividing, without replicating their DNA, to create daughter cells that randomly inherit one of each pair of chromosomes. Most animals and many plants are diploid for most of their lifespan, with the haploid form reduced to single cell gametes such as sperm or eggs.

Although they do not use the haploid/diploid method of sexual reproduction, bacteria have many methods of acquiring new genetic information. Some bacteria can undergo conjugation, transferring a small circular piece of DNA to another bacterium. Bacteria can also take up raw DNA fragments found in the environment and integrate them into their genomes, a phenomenon known as transformation. These processes result in horizontal gene transfer, transmitting fragments of genetic information between organisms that would be otherwise unrelated. Natural bacterial transformation occurs in many bacterial species, and can be regarded as a sexual process for transferring DNA from one cell to another cell (usually of the same species). Transformation requires the action of numerous bacterial gene products, and its primary adaptive function appears to be repair of DNA damages in the recipient cell.

=== Recombination and genetic linkage ===
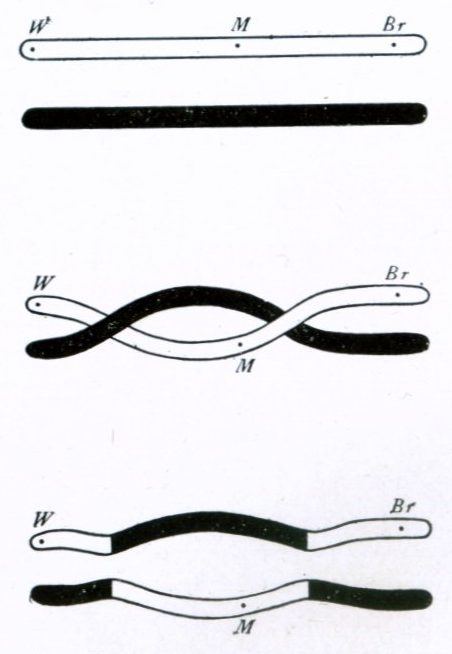
Thomas Hunt Morgan's 1916 illustration of a double crossover between chromosomes

The diploid nature of chromosomes allows for genes on different chromosomes to assort independently or be separated from their homologous pair during sexual reproduction wherein haploid gametes are formed. In this way new combinations of genes can occur in the offspring of a mating pair. Genes on the same chromosome would theoretically never recombine. However, they do, via the cellular process of chromosomal crossover. During crossover, chromosomes exchange stretches of DNA, effectively shuffling the gene alleles between the chromosomes. This process of chromosomal crossover generally occurs during meiosis, a series of cell divisions that creates haploid cells. Meiotic recombination, particularly in microbial eukaryotes, appears to serve the adaptive function of repair of DNA damages.

The first cytological demonstration of crossing over was performed by Harriet Creighton and Barbara McClintock in 1931. Their research and experiments on corn provided cytological evidence for the genetic theory that linked genes on paired chromosomes do in fact exchange places from one homolog to the other.

The probability of chromosomal crossover occurring between two given points on the chromosome is related to the distance between the points. For an arbitrarily long distance, the probability of crossover is high enough that the inheritance of the genes is effectively uncorrelated. For genes that are closer together, however, the lower probability of crossover means that the genes demonstrate genetic linkage; alleles for the two genes tend to be inherited together. The amounts of linkage between a series of genes can be combined to form a linear linkage map that roughly describes the arrangement of the genes along the chromosome.

== Gene expression ==
=== Genetic code ===
The genetic code: Using a triplet code, DNA, through a messenger RNA intermediary, specifies a protein.

Genes express their functional effect through the production of proteins, which are molecules responsible for most functions in the cell. Proteins are made up of one or more polypeptide chains, each composed of a sequence of amino acids. The DNA sequence of a gene is used to produce a specific amino acid sequence. This process begins with the production of an RNA molecule with a sequence matching the gene's DNA sequence, a process called transcription.

This messenger RNA molecule then serves to produce a corresponding amino acid sequence through a process called translation. Each group of three nucleotides in the sequence, called a codon, corresponds either to one of the twenty possible amino acids in a protein or an instruction to end the amino acid sequence; this correspondence is called the genetic code. The flow of information is unidirectional: information is transferred from nucleotide sequences into the amino acid sequence of proteins, but it never transfers from protein back into the sequence of DNA—a phenomenon Francis Crick called the central dogma of molecular biology.

The specific sequence of amino acids results in a unique three-dimensional structure for that protein, and the three-dimensional structures of proteins are related to their functions. Some are simple structural molecules, like the fibers formed by the protein collagen. Proteins can bind to other proteins and simple molecules, sometimes acting as enzymes by facilitating chemical reactions within the bound molecules (without changing the structure of the protein itself). Protein structure is dynamic; the protein hemoglobin bends into slightly different forms as it facilitates the capture, transport, and release of oxygen molecules within mammalian blood.

A single nucleotide difference within DNA can cause a change in the amino acid sequence of a protein. Because protein structures are the result of their amino acid sequences, some changes can dramatically change the properties of a protein by destabilizing the structure or changing the surface of the protein in a way that changes its interaction with other proteins and molecules. For example, sickle-cell anemia is a human genetic disease that results from a single base difference within the coding region for the β-globin section of hemoglobin, causing a single amino acid change that changes hemoglobin's physical properties. Sickle-cell versions of hemoglobin stick to themselves, stacking to form fibers that distort the shape of red blood cells carrying the protein. These sickle-shaped cells no longer flow smoothly through blood vessels, having a tendency to clog or degrade, causing the medical problems associated with this disease.

Some DNA sequences are transcribed into RNA but are not translated into protein products—such RNA molecules are called non-coding RNA. In some cases, these products fold into structures which are involved in critical cell functions (e.g. ribosomal RNA and transfer RNA). RNA can also have regulatory effects through hybridization interactions with other RNA molecules (such as microRNA).

=== Nature and nurture ===
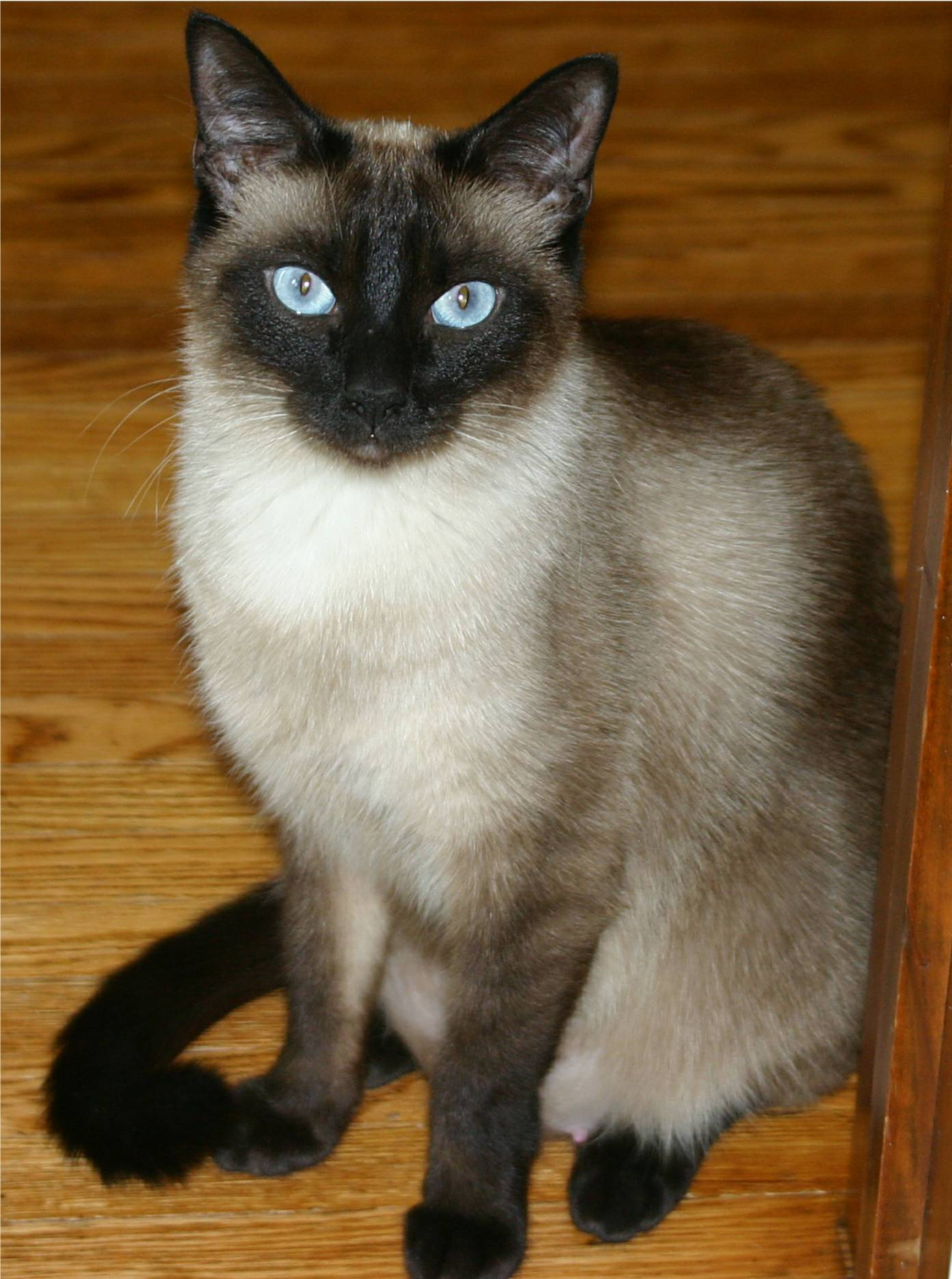
Siamese cats have a temperature-sensitive pigment-production mutation.

Although genes contain all the information an organism uses to function, the environment plays an important role in determining the ultimate phenotypes an organism displays. The phrase "nature and nurture" refers to this complementary relationship. The phenotype of an organism depends on the interaction of genes and the environment. An interesting example is the coat coloration of the Siamese cat. In this case, the body temperature of the cat plays the role of the environment. The cat's genes code for dark hair, thus the hair-producing cells in the cat make cellular proteins resulting in dark hair. But these dark hair-producing proteins are sensitive to temperature (i.e. have a mutation causing temperature-sensitivity) and denature in higher-temperature environments, failing to produce dark-hair pigment in areas where the cat has a higher body temperature. In a low-temperature environment, however, the protein's structure is stable and produces dark-hair pigment normally. The protein remains functional in areas of skin that are colder—such as its legs, ears, tail, and face—so the cat has dark hair at its extremities.

Environment plays a major role in effects of the human genetic disease phenylketonuria. The mutation that causes phenylketonuria disrupts the ability of the body to break down the amino acid phenylalanine, causing a toxic build-up of an intermediate molecule that, in turn, causes severe symptoms of progressive intellectual disability and seizures. However, if someone with the phenylketonuria mutation follows a strict diet that avoids this amino acid, they remain normal and healthy.

A common method for determining how genes and environment ("nature and nurture") contribute to a phenotype involves studying identical and fraternal twins, or other siblings of multiple births. Identical siblings are genetically the same since they come from the same zygote. Meanwhile, fraternal twins are as genetically different from one another as normal siblings. By comparing how often a certain disorder occurs in a pair of identical twins to how often it occurs in a pair of fraternal twins, scientists can determine whether that disorder is caused by genetic or postnatal environmental factors. One famous example involved the study of the Genain quadruplets, who were identical quadruplets all diagnosed with schizophrenia.

=== Gene regulation ===
The genome of a given organism contains thousands of genes, but not all these genes need to be active at any given moment. A gene is expressed when it is being transcribed into mRNA and there exist many cellular methods of controlling the expression of genes such that proteins are produced only when needed by the cell. Transcription factors are regulatory proteins that bind to DNA, either promoting or inhibiting the transcription of a gene. Within the genome of Escherichia coli bacteria, for example, there exists a series of genes necessary for the synthesis of the amino acid tryptophan. However, when tryptophan is already available to the cell, these genes for tryptophan synthesis are no longer needed. The presence of tryptophan directly affects the activity of the genes—tryptophan molecules bind to the tryptophan repressor (a transcription factor), changing the repressor's structure such that the repressor binds to the genes. The tryptophan repressor blocks the transcription and expression of the genes, thereby creating negative feedback regulation of the tryptophan synthesis process.

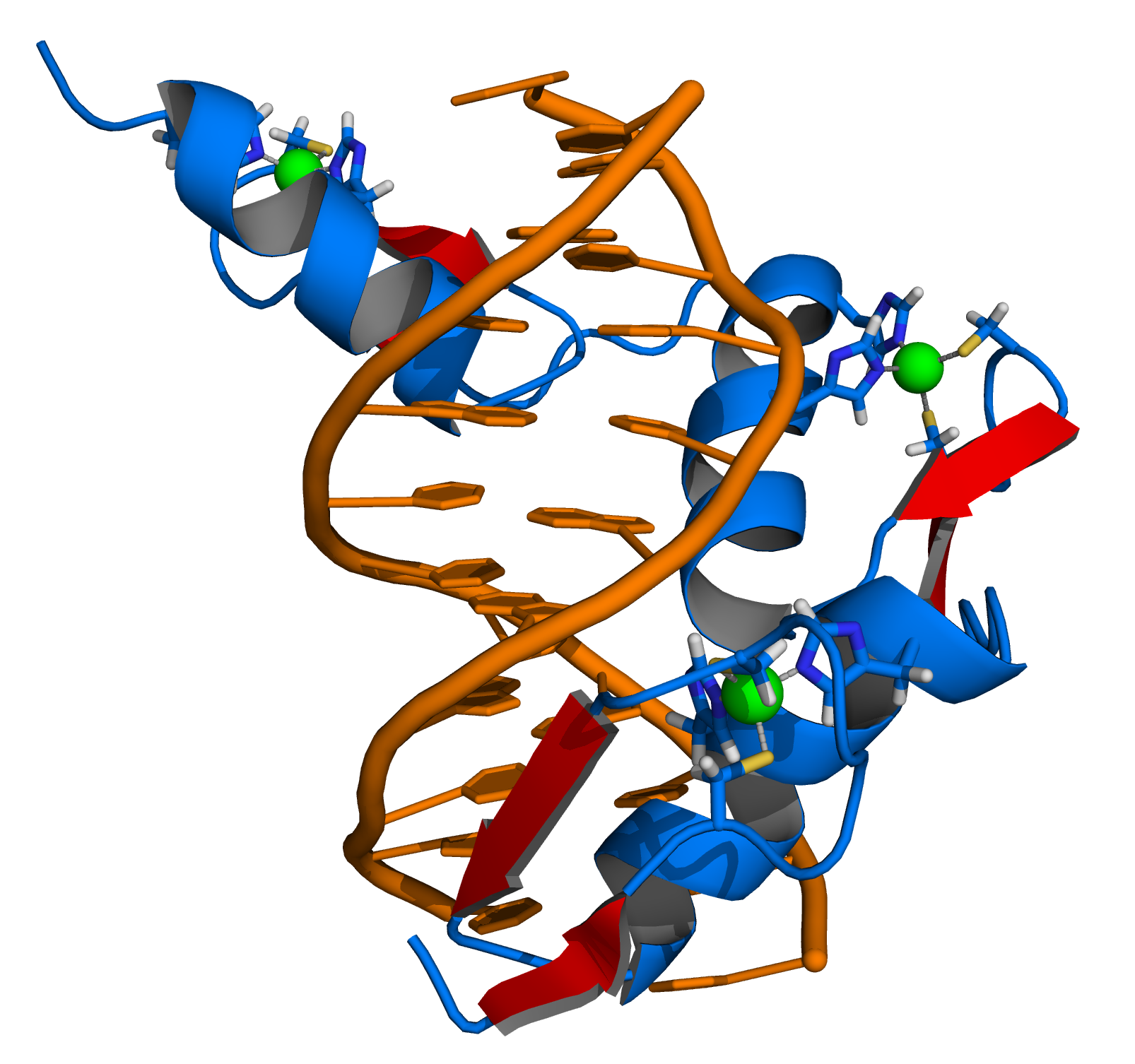
Transcription factors bind to DNA, influencing the transcription of associated genes.

Differences in gene expression are especially clear within multicellular organisms, where cells all contain the same genome but have very different structures and behaviors due to the expression of different sets of genes. All the cells in a multicellular organism derive from a single cell, differentiating into variant cell types in response to external and intercellular signals and gradually establishing different patterns of gene expression to create different behaviors.

Within eukaryotes, there exist structural features of chromatin that influence the transcription of genes, often in the form of modifications to DNA and chromatin that are stably inherited by daughter cells. These features are called "epigenetic" because they exist "on top" of the DNA sequence and retain inheritance from one cell generation to the next. Because of epigenetic features, different cell types grown within the same medium can retain very different properties. Although epigenetic features are generally dynamic over the course of development, some, like the phenomenon of paramutation, have multigenerational inheritance and exist as rare exceptions to the general rule of DNA as the basis for inheritance.

== Genetic change ==
=== Mutations ===
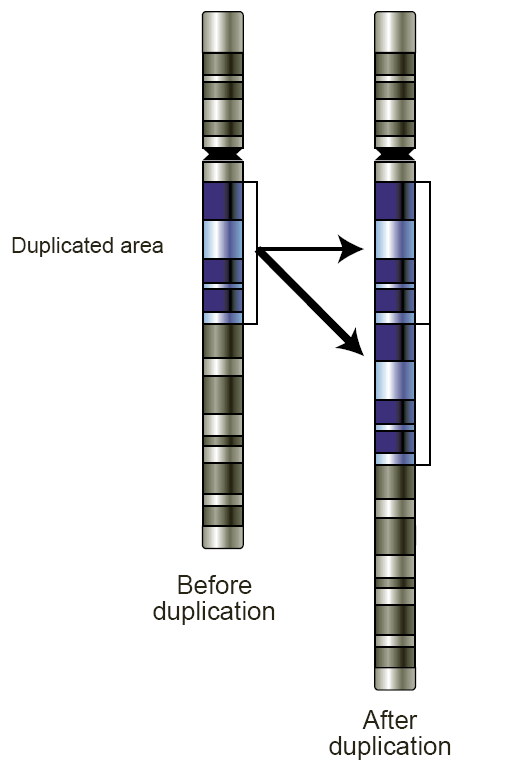
Gene duplication allows diversification by providing redundancy: one gene can mutate and lose its original function without harming the organism.

During the process of DNA replication, errors occasionally occur in the polymerization of the second strand. These errors, called mutations, can affect the phenotype of an organism, especially if they occur within the protein coding sequence of a gene. Error rates are usually very low—1 error in every 10–100 million bases—due to the "proofreading" ability of DNA polymerases. Processes that increase the rate of changes in DNA are called mutagenic: mutagenic chemicals promote errors in DNA replication, often by interfering with the structure of base-pairing, while UV radiation induces mutations by causing damage to the DNA structure. Chemical damage to DNA occurs naturally as well and cells use DNA repair mechanisms to repair mismatches and breaks. The repair does not, however, always restore the original sequence. A particularly important source of DNA damages appears to be reactive oxygen species produced by cellular aerobic respiration, and these can lead to mutations.

In organisms that use chromosomal crossover to exchange DNA and recombine genes, errors in alignment during meiosis can also cause mutations. Errors in crossover are especially likely when similar sequences cause partner chromosomes to adopt a mistaken alignment; this makes some regions in genomes more prone to mutating in this way. These errors create large structural changes in DNA sequence—duplications, inversions, deletions of entire regions—or the accidental exchange of whole parts of sequences between different chromosomes, chromosomal translocation.

This is a diagram showing mutations in an RNA sequence. Figure (1) is a normal RNA sequence, consisting of 4 codons. Figure (2) shows a missense, single point, non silent mutation. Figures (3 and 4) both show frameshift mutations, which is why they are grouped together. Figure 3 shows a deletion of the second base pair in the second codon. Figure 4 shows an insertion in the third base pair of the second codon. Figure (5) shows a repeat expansion, where an entire codon is duplicated.

=== Natural selection and evolution ===
Mutations alter an organism's genotype and occasionally this causes different phenotypes to appear. Most mutations have little effect on an organism's phenotype, health, or reproductive fitness. Mutations that do have an effect are usually detrimental, but occasionally some can be beneficial. Studies in the fly Drosophila melanogaster suggest that if a mutation changes a protein produced by a gene, about 70 percent of these mutations are harmful with the remainder being either neutral or weakly beneficial.

An evolutionary tree of eukaryotic organisms, constructed by the comparison of several orthologous gene sequences

Population genetics studies the distribution of genetic differences within populations and how these distributions change over time. Changes in the frequency of an allele in a population are mainly influenced by natural selection, where a given allele provides a selective or reproductive advantage to the organism, as well as other factors such as mutation, genetic drift, genetic hitchhiking, artificial selection and migration.

Over many generations, the genomes of organisms can change significantly, resulting in evolution. In the process called adaptation, selection for beneficial mutations can cause a species to evolve into forms better able to survive in their environment. New species are formed through the process of speciation, often caused by geographical separations that prevent populations from exchanging genes with each other.

By comparing the homology between different species' genomes, it is possible to calculate the evolutionary distance between them and when they may have diverged. Genetic comparisons are generally considered a more accurate method of characterizing the relatedness between species than the comparison of phenotypic characteristics. The evolutionary distances between species can be used to form evolutionary trees; these trees represent the common descent and divergence of species over time, although they do not show the transfer of genetic material between unrelated species (known as horizontal gene transfer and most common in bacteria).

== Research and technology ==
=== Model organisms ===
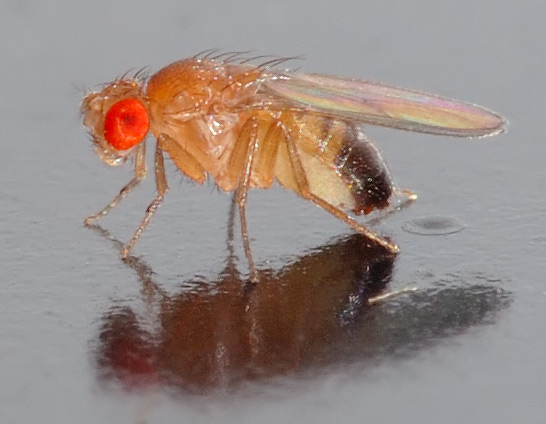
The common fruit fly (Drosophila melanogaster) is a popular model organism in genetics research.

Although geneticists originally studied inheritance in a wide variety of organisms, the range of species studied has narrowed. One reason is that when significant research already exists for a given organism, new researchers are more likely to choose it for further study, and so eventually a few model organisms became the basis for most genetics research. Common research topics in model organism genetics include the study of gene regulation and the involvement of genes in development and cancer. Organisms were chosen, in part, for convenience—short generation times and easy genetic manipulation made some organisms popular genetics research tools. Widely used model organisms include the gut bacterium Escherichia coli, the plant Arabidopsis thaliana, baker's yeast (Saccharomyces cerevisiae), the nematode Caenorhabditis elegans, the common fruit fly (Drosophila melanogaster), the zebrafish (Danio rerio), and the common house mouse (Mus musculus).

=== Medicine ===
Schematic relationship between biochemistry, genetics and molecular biology

Medical genetics seeks to understand how genetic variation relates to human health and disease. When searching for an unknown gene that may be involved in a disease, researchers commonly use genetic linkage and genetic pedigree charts to find the location on the genome associated with the disease. At the population level, researchers take advantage of genome wide association studies (GWAS) to look for locations in the genome that are associated with diseases, a method especially useful for multigenic traits not clearly defined by a single gene. Once a candidate gene is found, further research is often done on the corresponding (or homologous) genes of model organisms. In addition to studying genetic diseases, the increased availability of genotyping methods has led to the field of pharmacogenetics: the study of how genotype can affect drug responses.

Individuals differ in their inherited tendency to develop cancer, and cancer is a genetic disease. The process of cancer development in the body is a combination of events. Mutations occasionally occur within cells in the body as they divide. Although these mutations will not be inherited by any offspring, they can affect the behavior of cells, sometimes causing them to grow and divide more frequently. There are biological mechanisms that attempt to stop this process; signals are given to inappropriately dividing cells that should trigger cell death, but sometimes additional mutations occur that cause cells to ignore these messages. An internal process of natural selection occurs within the body and eventually mutations accumulate within cells to promote their own growth, creating a cancerous tumor that grows and invades various tissues of the body. Normally, a cell divides only in response to signals called growth factors and stops growing once in contact with surrounding cells and in response to growth-inhibitory signals. It usually then divides a limited number of times and dies, staying within the epithelium where it is unable to migrate to other organs. To become a cancer cell, a cell has to accumulate mutations in a number of genes (three to seven). A cancer cell can divide without growth factor and ignores inhibitory signals. Also, it is immortal and can grow indefinitely, even after it makes contact with neighboring cells. It may escape from the epithelium and ultimately from the primary tumor. Then, the escaped cell can cross the endothelium of a blood vessel and get transported by the bloodstream to colonize a new organ, forming deadly metastasis. Although there are some genetic predispositions in a small fraction of cancers, the major fraction is due to a set of new genetic mutations that originally appear and accumulate in one or a small number of cells that will divide to form the tumor and are not transmitted to the progeny (somatic mutations). The most frequent mutations are a loss of function of p53 protein, a tumor suppressor, or in the p53 pathway, and gain of function mutations in the Ras proteins, or in other oncogenes.

=== Research methods ===
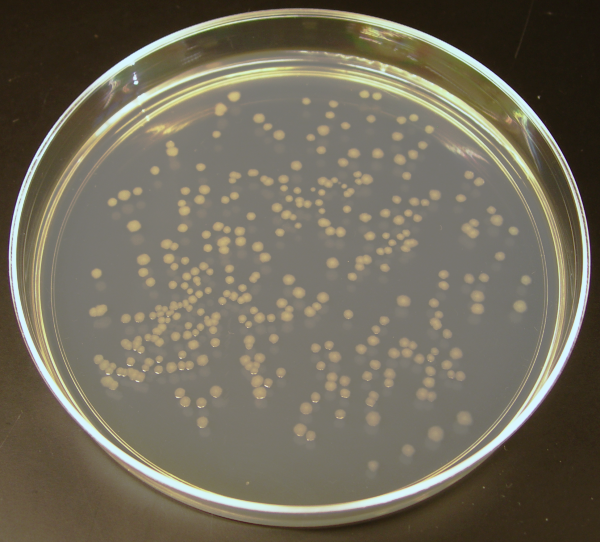
Colonies of E. coli produced by cellular cloning. A similar methodology is often used in molecular cloning.

DNA can be manipulated in the laboratory. Restriction enzymes are commonly used enzymes that cut DNA at specific sequences, producing predictable fragments of DNA. DNA fragments can be visualized through use of gel electrophoresis, which separates fragments according to their length.

The use of ligation enzymes allows DNA fragments to be connected. By binding ("ligating") fragments of DNA together from different sources, researchers can create recombinant DNA, the DNA often associated with genetically modified organisms. Recombinant DNA is commonly used in the context of plasmids: short circular DNA molecules with a few genes on them. In the process known as molecular cloning, researchers can amplify the DNA fragments by inserting plasmids into bacteria and then culturing them on plates of agar (to isolate clones of bacteria cells). "Cloning" can also refer to the various means of creating cloned ("clonal") organisms.

DNA can also be amplified using a procedure called the polymerase chain reaction (PCR). By using specific short sequences of DNA, PCR can isolate and exponentially amplify a targeted region of DNA. Because it can amplify from extremely small amounts of DNA, PCR is also often used to detect the presence of specific DNA sequences.

=== DNA sequencing and genomics ===
DNA sequencing, one of the most fundamental technologies developed to study genetics, allows researchers to determine the sequence of nucleotides in DNA fragments. The technique of chain-termination sequencing, developed in 1977 by a team led by Frederick Sanger, is still routinely used to sequence DNA fragments. Using this technology, researchers have been able to study the molecular sequences associated with many human diseases.

As sequencing has become less expensive, researchers have sequenced the genomes of many organisms using a process called genome assembly, which uses computational tools to stitch together sequences from many different fragments. These technologies were used to sequence the human genome in the Human Genome Project completed in 2003. New high-throughput sequencing technologies are dramatically lowering the cost of DNA sequencing, with many researchers hoping to bring the cost of resequencing a human genome down to a thousand dollars.

Next-generation sequencing (or high-throughput sequencing) came about due to the ever-increasing demand for low-cost sequencing. These sequencing technologies allow the production of potentially millions of sequences concurrently. The large amount of sequence data available has created the subfield of genomics, research that uses computational tools to search for and analyze patterns in the full genomes of organisms. Genomics can also be considered a subfield of bioinformatics, which uses computational approaches to analyze large sets of biological data.

== Society and culture ==
On 19 March 2015, a group of leading biologists urged a worldwide ban on clinical use of methods, particularly the use of CRISPR and zinc finger, to edit the human genome in a way that can be inherited. In April 2015, Chinese researchers reported results of basic research to edit the DNA of non-viable human embryos using CRISPR.

== See also ==
- Bacterial genome size
- Cryoconservation of animal genetic resources
- Eugenics
- Embryology
- Genetic disorder
- Genetic diversity
- Genetic engineering
- Genetic enhancement
- Glossary of genetics (M−Z)
- Index of genetics articles
- Lysenkoism
- Medical genetics
- Molecular tools for gene study
- Neuroepigenetics
- Outline of genetics
- Timeline of the history of genetics
- Plant genetic resources
