= Henrietta Camilla Jenkin =

English novelist (c. 1807–1885)

Henrietta Jenkin
- Born: c. 1807; Jamaica
- Died: 1885 (aged 77–78) prob. Edinburgh, Scotland
- Occupation: Novelist
- Writing career
- Notable works: Cousin Stella; or, Conflict (1859)

Henrietta Jenkin or Henrietta Jackson; Henrietta Camilla Jenkin; Henrietta Camilla Jackson (1807–1885) was an English novelist.

== Life ==
Jenkin was born in Jamaica in about 1807. She was the only daughter in four children. She married in 1832 and her son Fleeming Jenkin was born the following year. By 1840, she was publishing the first of her books. In 1859, she made her name when she published the anti-slavery novel Cousin Stella; or, Conflict.

She moved to Paris, France, in 1847 and the next year she went to Genoa, Italy. While there, she was involved in Liberal causes, until she left in 1851. She moved to Edinburgh, Scotland, when her son was appointed a professor at the university.

Jenkin and her husband were living in Edinburgh when she died only days after him in 1885.

== Works ==
- Cousin Stella; or, Conflict, 1859
- Who Breaks, Pays, 1861
- Skirmishing, 1862.
- Once and Again, 1865.
- Two French Marriages, 1868 (republished in New York as A Psyche of To-day, 1868)
- Madame de Beauprés, 1869.
- Within an Ace, 1869.
- Jupiter's Daughters, 1874.
