= Fleeming Jenkin =

British polymath (1833-1885)

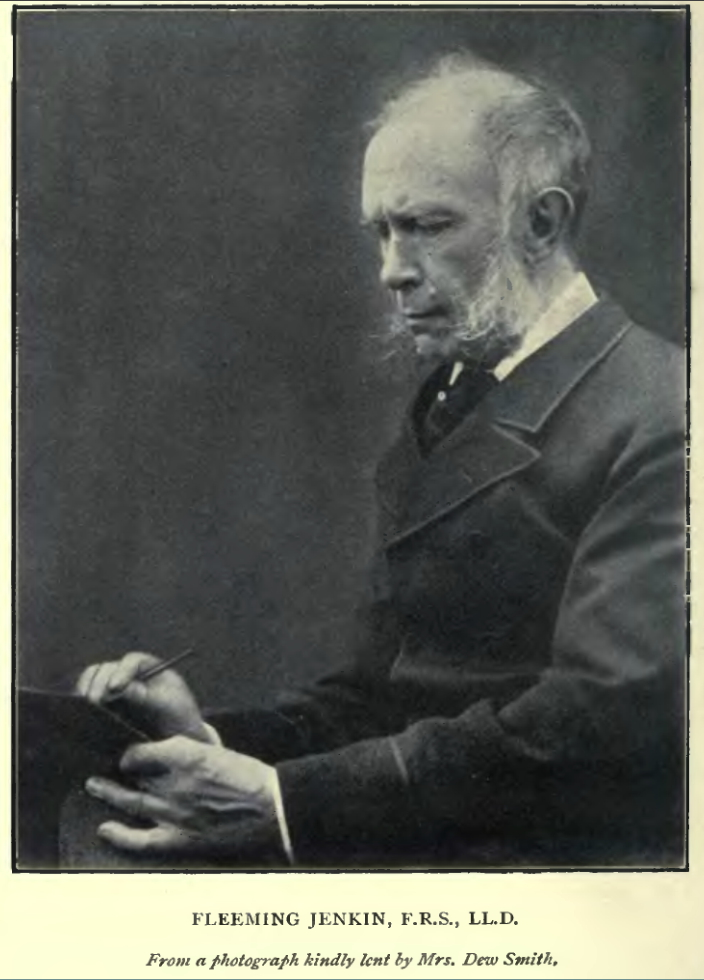
- Born: 25 March 1833; Dungeness, Kent, England, UK
- Died: 12 June 1885 (aged 52); Edinburgh, Scotland, UK
- Education: University of Genoa (M.A.) University of Edinburgh
- Known for: Telpherage
- Scientific career
- Workplaces: University of Edinburgh University College London

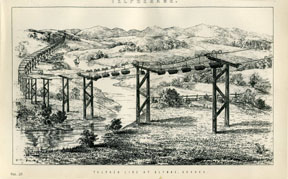
Drawing of the first ever aerial tramway or telpher, designed and engineered by Fleeming Jenkin. It was installed in Glynde in Sussex in 1885 to transport clay, and was finished after Jenkin's death.

Henry Charles Fleeming Jenkin FRS FRSE (/ˈflɛmɪŋ/; 25 March 1833 – 12 June 1885) was a British engineer, inventor, economist, linguist, actor and dramatist known as the inventor of the cable car or telpherage. He was Regius Professor of Engineering at the University of Edinburgh. His descendants include the engineer Charles Frewen Jenkin and through him the Conservative MPs Patrick, Lord Jenkin of Roding and Bernard Jenkin.

== Early life ==
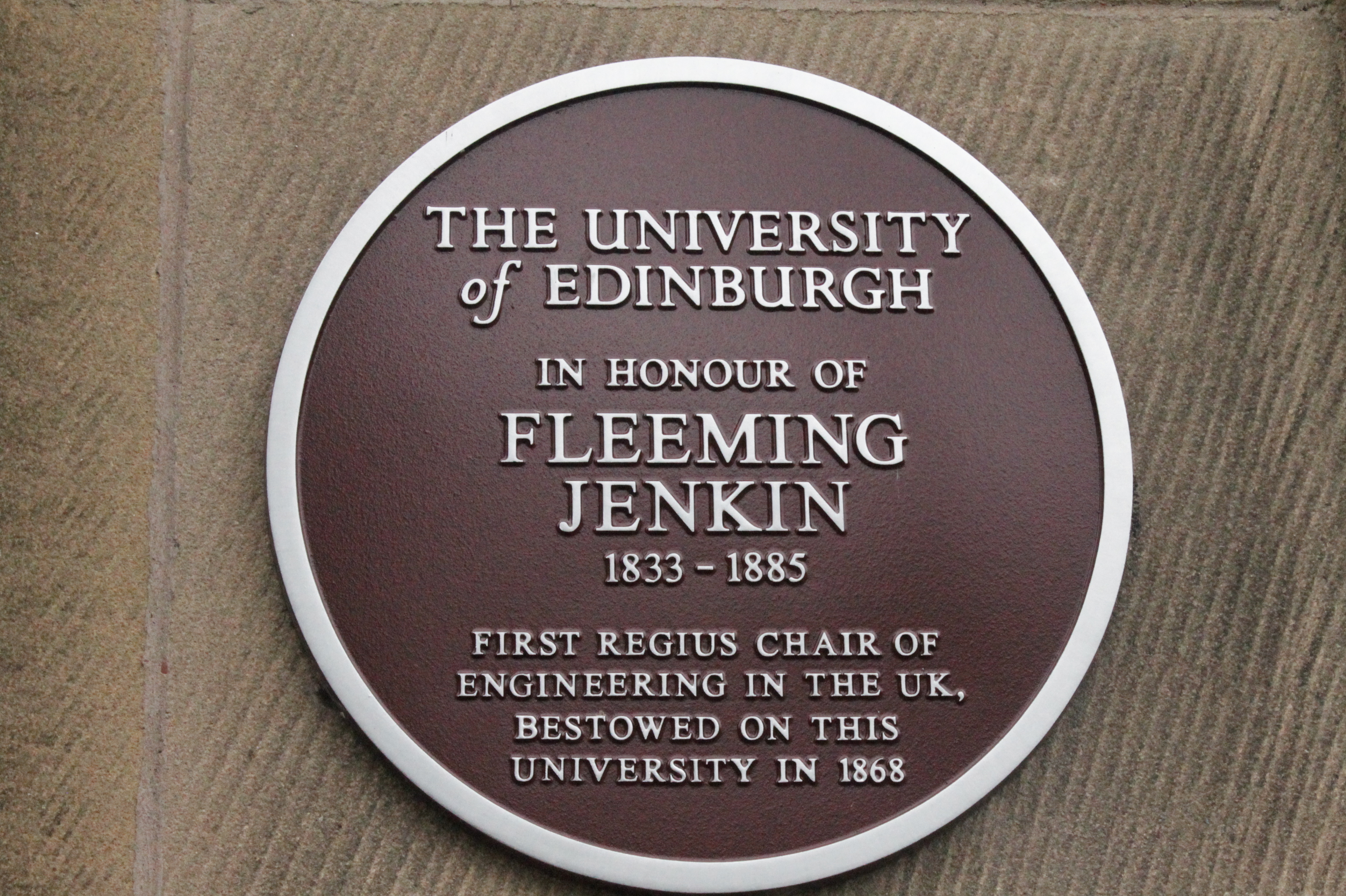
Plaque to Fleeming Jenkin, King's Buildings, Edinburgh

=== Background and childhood ===
Generally called Fleeming Jenkin, named after Admiral Fleeming, one of his father's patrons, he was born to an old and eccentric family in a government building near Dungeness, Kent, England. His father, Captain Charles Jenkin, was in the coast-guard service at that time. His mother, Henrietta Camilla (Cora) Jenkin (born Jackson) was a published author. His mother was responsible for Jenkin's education. She took him to the south of Scotland, where, chiefly at Barjarg, she taught him drawing and allowed him to ride his pony on the moors. He went to school at Jedburgh, Borders, and afterwards to the Edinburgh Academy, where he won many prizes. Among his school fellows were James Clerk Maxwell and Peter Guthrie Tait.

On his father's retirement in 1847, the family moved to Frankfurt, partly from motives of economy and partly for the boy's education. Here Jenkin and his father spent a pleasant time together, sketching old castles, and observing the customs of the peasantry. At thirteen, Jenkin had produced a romance of three hundred lines in heroic couplets, a novel, and a large number of poems, none of which are now extant. He learned German in Frankfurt and, on the family migrating to Paris the following year, he studied French and mathematics under a M. Deluc. While there, Jenkin witnessed the outbreak of the Revolution of 1848 and heard the first shot, describing the action in a letter written to an old schoolfellow.

The Jenkins left Paris, and went to Genoa, where they experienced another revolution, and Mrs. Jenkin, with her son and sister-in-law, had to seek the protection of a British vessel in the harbour, leaving their house stored with the property of their friends, and guarded by Captain Jenkin. At Genoa, Jenkin attended the University of Genoa, being its first Protestant student. Father Bancalari, the professor of natural philosophy, lectured on electromagnetism, his physical laboratory being the best in Italy. Jenkin took the degree of M.A. with first-class honours, his special subject having been electromagnetism. The questions in the examinations were in Latin, and had to be answered in Italian. Fleeming also attended an art school in the city, and gained a silver medal for a drawing from one of Raphael's cartoons. His holidays were spent in sketching, and his evenings in learning to play the piano or, when permissible, at the theatre or opera-house. He had conceived a taste for acting. He attended the University of Edinburgh in 1851.

=== Training as engineer and artist ===
In 1850, Jenkin spent some time in a Genoese locomotive shop under Philip Taylor of Marseille but on the death of his Aunt Anna, who lived with them, Captain Jenkin took his family back to England, and settled in Manchester, where the young man, in 1851, was apprenticed to mechanical engineering at the works of William Fairbairn, and from half-past eight in the morning until six at night had, as he says, "to file and chip vigorously, in a moleskin suit, and infernally dirty.

"At home he pursued his studies, and was for a time engaged with Dr. Bell in working out a geometrical method of arriving at the proportions of Ancient Greek architecture. His stay in Manchester, though in striking contrast to his life in Genoa, was agreeable. He liked his work, had the good spirits of youth, and made some pleasant friends, one of them the author, Elizabeth Gaskell. He was argumentative, and his mother tells of his having overcome a consul at Genoa in a political discussion when he was only sixteen 'simply from being well-informed on the subject, and honest. He is as true as steel,' she writes, 'and for no one will he bend right or left... Do not fancy him a Bobadil; he is only a very true, candid boy. I am so glad he remains in all respects but information a great child.'"

"On leaving Fairbairn's he was engaged for a time on a survey for the proposed Lukmanier Railway in Switzerland, and in 1856 he entered Penn's engineering works at Greenwich as a draughtsman, being occupied on the plans of a vessel designed for the Crimean War. He complained about the late hours, his rough comrades, and his humble lodgings, 'across a dirty green and through some half-built streets of two-storied houses.... Luckily, he adds, 'I am fond of my profession, or I could not stand this life.' Jenkin had been his mother's pet until then, and felt the change from home more keenly for that reason. At night he read engineering and mathematics, or Thomas Carlyle and the poets, and cheered his drooping spirits with frequent trips to London to see his mother."

"Another social pleasure was his visits to the house of Alfred Austin, a barrister, who became permanent secretary to Her Majesty's Office of Works and Public Buildings, and retired in 1868 with the title of CB. His wife, Eliza Barron, was the youngest daughter of a gentleman of Norwich who, when a child, had been patted on the head, in his father's shop, by Dr Samuel Johnson, while canvassing for Mr. Thrale. Jenkin had been introduced to the Austins by a letter from Mrs. Gaskell, and was charmed with the atmosphere of their choice home, where intellectual conversation was happily united with kind and courteous manners, without any pretence or affectation. "Each of the Austins," says Stevenson in his memoir of Jenkin, "was full of high spirits; each practised something of the same repression; no sharp word was uttered in the house." The Austins were truly hospitable and cultured, not merely so in form and appearance. It was a rare privilege and preservative for a solitary young man in Jenkin's position to have the entry into such elevating society and he appreciated his good fortune."

"Annie Austin, their only child, had been highly educated and knew Greek among other things. Though Jenkin loved and admired her parents he did not at first care for Annie. Stevenson hints that she vanquished him by correcting a "false quantity" of his one day; he was the man to reflect over a correction, and "admire the castigator." Jenkin was poor but the liking of her parents for him gave him hope. He had entered the service of Messrs. Liddell and Gordon who were engaged in the new work of submarine telegraphy, which satisfied his aspirations, and promised him a successful career. He therefore asked the Austins for leave to court their daughter. Mrs. Austin consented freely, and Mr. Austin only reserved the right to inquire into his character. Jenkin, overcome by their disinterestedness, exclaimed in one of his letters "Are these people the same as other people?" Miss Austin seems to have resented his courtship of her parents first but the mother's favour and his own spirited behaviour saved him and won her consent."

After leaving Penn's, Jenkin became a railroad engineer under Liddell and Gordon, and, in 1857, became engineer to R.S. Newall and Company of Gateshead who shared the work of making the first Atlantic cable with Glass, Elliott & Co. of Greenwich. Jenkin was busy designing and fitting up machinery for cableships, and making electrical experiments. "I am half crazy with work," he wrote to his fiancée; "I like it though: it's like a good ball, the excitement carries you through." He wrote, "My profession gives me all the excitement and interest I ever hope for...I am at the works till ten, and sometimes till eleven. But I have a nice office to sit in, with a fire to myself, and bright brass scientific instruments all round me, and books to read, and experiments to make, and enjoy myself amazingly. I find the study of electricity so entertaining that I am apt to neglect my other work... What shall I compare them to," he writes of some electrical experiments, "a new song? or a Greek play?"

== Cable-laying on the Elba ==
=== First voyage ===
In the spring of 1855, he was fitting out the S.S. Elba at Birkenhead for his first telegraph cruise. Earlier in 1855, John Watkins Brett had attempted to lay a cable across the Mediterranean between Cape Spartivento, in the south of Sardinia, and a point near Bona, on the coast of Algeria. It was a gutta-percha cable of six wires or conductors, manufactured by Glass, Elliott & Co., a firm which afterwards combined with the Gutta-Percha Company and became the Telegraph Construction and Maintenance Company. Brett laid the cable from the Result, a sailing ship in tow, instead of a more manageable steamer. Meeting with 600 fathoms (1100 m) of water when twenty-five miles (45 km) from land, the cable ran out so fast that a tangled skein came up out of the hold and the line had to be severed. Having only 150 miles (240 km) on board to span the whole distance of 140 miles (230 km), he grappled the lost cable near the shore, raised it, and under-ran or passed it over the ship, for some twenty miles (32 km), then cut it, leaving the seaward end on the bottom. He then spliced the ship's cable to the shoreward end and resumed paying-out but after seventy miles (110 km) in all were laid, another rapid rush of cable took place, and Brett was obliged to cut and abandon the line.

Another attempt was made the following year, but with no better success. Brett then tried to lay a three-wire cable from the steamer Dutchman; but owing to the deep water (in some places 1500 fathoms or 2700 m) when he came to a few miles from Galita, his destination on the Algerian coast, he had not enough cable to reach the land. He telegraphed to London for more cable to be made and sent out, while the ship remained there holding the end. After five days the cable parted, perhaps as a result of rubbing on the bottom.

It was to recover the lost cable of these expeditions that the Elba was got ready for sea. Jenkin had fitted her out the year before for laying the Cagliari to Malta and Corfu cables but on this occasion she was better equipped. She had a new machine for picking up the cable, and a sheave or pulley at the bows for it to run over, both designed by Jenkin, together with a variety of wooden buoys, ropes, and chains. Liddell, assisted by F. C. Webb and Fleeming Jenkin, was in charge of the expedition. Jenkin had nothing to do with the electrical work, his care being the deck machinery for raising the cable but it was a responsible job. He reported the expedition in letters to Miss Austin and in diary entries.

During the latter part of the work much of the cable was found to be looped and twisted into 'kinks' from having been so slackly laid and two immense tangled skeins were raised on board, one by means of the mast-head and fore-yard tackle. Photographs of this raveled cable were exhibited as a curiosity in the windows of Newall & Co.'s shop in The Strand. By 5 July the whole of the six-wire cable had been recovered and a portion of the three-wire cable, the rest being abandoned as unfit for use, owing to its twisted condition. On the evening of the 2nd the first mate, while on the water unshackling a buoy, was struck in the back by a fluke of the ship's anchor as she drifted, and so severely injured that he lay for many weeks at Cagliari. Jenkin's knowledge of languages made him useful as an interpreter but, in mentioning this incident to Miss Austin, he writes, For no fortune would I be a doctor to witness these scenes continually. Pain is a terrible thing.

=== Future partners ===
"Early in 1859 he met William Thomson (later Sir William Thomson, and still later Lord Kelvin), his future friend and partner. Lewis Gordon, of Newall & Co., subsequently the first professor of engineering in a British University, was in Glasgow seeing Thomson's instruments for testing and signalling on the first Atlantic cable during the six weeks of its working. Gordon said he should like to show them to a young man of remarkable ability, engaged at their Birkenhead works. Jenkin was telegraphed for, arrived next morning, and spent a week in Glasgow, mostly in Thomson's classroom and laboratory at the old college. Thomson was struck with Jenkin's brightness, ability, thoroughness and determination to learn. I soon found,' he remarked, 'that thoroughness of honesty was as strongly engrained in the scientific as in the moral side of his character. Their talk was chiefly on the electric telegraph but Jenkin was eager, too, on the subject of physics. After staying a week he returned to the factory but he began experiments and corresponded briskly with Thomson about cable work. Thomson seems to have infected his visitor during their brief contact with the magnetic force of his personality and enthusiasm."

On 26 February, during a four days' leave, Jenkin married Miss Austin at Northiam in Sussex, returning to his work the following Tuesday. He was strongly attached to his wife and his letters reveal a warmth of affection which a casual observer would never have suspected in him. In 1869 he wrote, People may write novels, and other people may write poems, but not a man or woman among them can say how happy a man can be who is desperately in love with his wife after ten years of marriage. Five weeks before his death he wrote to her, Your first letter from Bournemouth gives me heavenly pleasure – for which I thank Heaven and you, too, who are my heaven on earth.

=== Second voyage ===
During the summer he took another telegraph cruise in the Mediterranean. This time the Elba was to lay a cable from the Greek islands of Syros and Crete to Egypt. He again reported in letters to his wife.

== Entrepreneur and academic ==
=== Partnership with Forde ===
"In 1861, Jenkin left the service of Newall & Co. and entered into partnership with H. C. Forde, who had acted as engineer under the British Government for the Malta-Alexandria cable, and was now practising as a civil engineer. For several years, business was bad."

=== Domestic life ===
In 1859 he married Ann Austin.

With a young family coming, it was an anxious time but he bore his troubles lightly. Robert Louis Stevenson says in his memoir of Jenkin that it was his principle to enjoy each day's happiness as it arises, like birds and children.

In 1863 his first son was born and the family moved to a cottage at Claygate near Esher. Though ill and poor, he kept up his self-confidence. The country, he wrote to his wife, will give us, please God, health and strength. I will love and cherish you more than ever. You shall go where you wish, you shall receive whom you wish, and as for money, you shall have that too. I cannot be mistaken. I have now measured myself with many men. I do not feel weak. I do not feel that I shall fail. In many things I have succeeded, and I will in this.... And meanwhile, the time of waiting, which, please Heaven, shall not be so long, shall also not be so bitter. Well, well, I promise much, and do not know at this moment how you and the dear child are. If he is but better, courage, my girl, for I see light.

He took to gardening, without a natural liking for it, and soon became an ardent expert. He wrote reviews and lectured or amused himself in playing charades and reading poetry. James Clerk Maxwell was among his visitors. During October 1860, he superintended the repairs of the Bona-Spartivento cable, revisiting Chia and Cagliari, then full of Garibaldi's troops. The cable, which had been broken by the anchors of coral fishers, was grapnelled with difficulty. What rocks we did hook! writes Jenkin. No sooner was the grapnel down than the ship was anchored; and then came such a business: ship's engines going, deck engine thundering, belt slipping, tear of breaking ropes; actually breaking grapnels. It was always an hour or more before we could get the grapnels down again.

In 1865, on the birth of their second son, Mrs. Jenkin was very ill, and Jenkin, after running two miles for a doctor, knelt by her bedside during the night in a draught. He suffered from rheumatism and sciatica ever afterwards. It nearly disabled him while laying the cable from Lowestoft to Norderney in Germany for Paul Reuter in 1866. This line was designed by Forde & Jenkin, manufactured by Messrs. W. T. Henley & Co., and laid by the Caroline and William Cory. Clara Volkman, a niece of Reuter, sent the first message, with the telegraph engineer C. F. Varley holding her hand.

=== Professor at London and Edinburgh ===
"In 1866, Jenkin was appointed as professor (chair) of engineering at University College London. Two years later his prospects suddenly improved. The partnership began to pay and he was selected to fill the newly established Regius Chair of Engineering at Edinburgh University. He wrote to his wife: 'With you in the garden (at Claygate), with Austin in the coach-house, with pretty songs in the little low white room, with the moonlight in the dear room upstairs—ah! it was perfect; but the long walk, wondering, pondering, fearing, scheming, and the dusty jolting railway, and the horrid fusty office, with its endless disappointments, they are well gone. It is well enough to fight, and scheme, and bustle about in the eager crowd here (in London) for a while now and then; but not for a lifetime. What I have now is just perfect. Study for winter, action for summer, lovely country for recreation, a pleasant town for talk.'"

"The following June he was on board the Great Eastern while she laid the French Atlantic cable from Brest to Saint-Pierre. Among his shipmates were Sir William Thomson, Sir James Anderson, C. F. Varley, Latimer Clark and Willoughby Smith. Jenkin's sketches of Clark and Varley are remarkable. At Saint-Pierre they arrived in a fog which lifted to show their consort, the William Cory, straight ahead, and the Gulnare signalling a welcome. Jenkin observed that the whole island was electrified by the battery at the telegraph station."

=== Partnership with Thomson and Varley ===
"Jenkin's position at Edinburgh led to a partnership in cable work with Varley and Thomson, whom he always admired. Jenkin's practical and businesslike abilities were of assistance to Thomson, relieving him of routine and sparing his time for other work. In 1870 the siphon recorder for tracing a cablegram in ink instead of merely flashing it by the moving ray of the mirror galvanometer, was introduced on long cables and became a source of profit to Jenkin and Varley as well as to Thomson, its inventor."

"In 1873 Thomson and Jenkin were engineers for the Western and Brazilian cable. It was manufactured by Hooper & Co., of Millwall and the wire was coated with india rubber, then a new insulator. The Hooper left Plymouth in June, and after touching at Madeira, where Thomson was up 'sounding with his special toy' (the pianoforte wire) 'at half-past three in the morning,' they reached Pernambuco by the beginning of August, and laid a cable to Pará."

"During the next two years the Brazilian system was connected to the West Indies and the Río de la Plata but Jenkin was not present on the expeditions. While engaged in this work, the ill-fated La Plata, carrying cable from the Siemens company to Montevideo, sank in a cyclone off Ushant with the loss of nearly all her crew. The Mackay-Bennett Atlantic cables were also laid under their charge."

=== Pioneer of the supply and demand graphic ===
In 1870, Jenkin published the essay "On the Graphical Representation of the Laws of Supply and Demand and their Application to Labour," in which he "introduced the diagrammatic method into the English economic literature" – an early published instance of supply and demand curves. His treatment extended beyond earlier treatments on the Continent (not apparently known by him), complete with comparative statics (a change in equilibrium from a shifts of a curve), welfare analysis, application to the labour market, and market-period and long-run distinctions. It was later popularised by Alfred Marshall and remains arguably the most famous graphic in economics.

=== Sanitary protection associations ===
In 1878 Jenkin made a contribution to public health with his pamphlet Healthy Houses. "This was not a completely new interest, for sewerage systems were part of the degree course which he taught, and he had already contributed on the subject to the Sanitary Record."

The suggestion was made by William Fairbairn that house inspection by an association of competent individuals would protect homeowners from incompetent tradesmen and outline clearly work necessary for sanitary protection. Jenkin noted, "In respect of Domestic Sanitation the business of Engineer and that of the medical man overlap." With the assent of Robert Christison, the concept took hold in Edinburgh and Saint Andrews, then in Newport, USA. The report by Alexander Fergusson noted two associations in London in 1882, and sixteen globally.

"Jenkin acted as consulting engineer to the association without pay, rather, as he explained it, like a hospital for the poor where a leading physician would give his services free. ... [The Sanitary Protection Association] was simple, pragmatic, popular – within a few months, there were five hundred subscribers in Edinburgh, and similar groups quickly formed in other British cities ..."

== Personality and assessment ==
Jenkin was a clear, fluent speaker, and a successful teacher. He is described as being of medium height, and very plain, with an unimposing manner. His class was always in good order, for he instantly spotted and disciplined anyone who misbehaved. His experimental work was not strikingly original. At Birkenhead he made some accurate measurements of the electrical properties of materials used in submarine cables. Sir William Thomson noted that he was the first to apply the absolute methods of measurement introduced by Gauss and Weber. He also investigated the laws of electric signals in submarine cables. As Secretary to the British Association Committee on Electrical Standards he played a leading part in providing electricians with practical standards of measurement. His Cantor lectures on submarine cables, and his treatise on Electricity and Magnetism, published in 1873, were notable at the time, including the latest developments in the subject. He was associated with Thomson in an ingenious 'curb-key' for sending signals automatically through a long cable; but it was never adopted. His most important invention was telpherage, a means of transporting goods and passengers to a distance by electric panniers supported on a wire or conductor, which supplied them with electricity. It was patented in 1882, and Jenkin spent his last years on this work, expecting great results from it; but before the first public line was opened for traffic at Glynde, in Sussex, he was dead.

In mechanical engineering his graphical methods of calculating strains in bridges, and determining the efficiency of mechanism, were valuable, and won him the Keith Gold Medal from the Royal Society of Edinburgh. In his spare time Jenkin wrote papers on a wide variety of subjects. Munro, the scholar, complimented him for his paper The Atomic Theory of Lucretius. In 1878 he constructed a phonograph from the newspaper reports of this new invention, and lectured on it in Edinburgh, then employed it to study the nature of vowel and consonantal sounds. An interesting paper on 'Rhythm in English Verse,' was also published by him in the Saturday Review for 1883.

He could draw a portrait with astonishing rapidity, and had been known to stop a passer-by for a few minutes and sketch her on the spot. His artistic side also shows itself in a paper on 'Artist and Critic,' in which he defines the difference between the mechanical and fine arts. 'In mechanical arts,' he says, 'the craftsman uses his skill to produce something useful, but (except in the rare case when he is at liberty to choose what he shall produce) his sole merit lies in skill. In the fine arts the student uses skill to produce something beautiful. He is free to choose what that something shall be, and the layman claims that he may and must judge the artist chiefly by the value in beauty of the thing done. Artistic skill contributes to beauty, or it would not be skill; but beauty is the result of many elements, and the nobler the art the lower is the rank which skill takes among them.'

Jenkin was a clear and graphic writer. He read selectively, preferring the story of David, the Odyssey, the Arcadia, the saga of Burnt Njal, and the Grand Cyrus. Aeschylus, Sophocles, Shakespeare, Ariosto, Boccaccio, Sir Walter Scott, Dumas, Charles Dickens, William Makepeace Thackeray, and George Eliot were some of his favourite authors. He was a rapid, fluent talker. Some of his sayings were shrewd and sharp; but he was sometimes aggressive. 'People admire what is pretty in an ugly thing,' he used to say 'not the ugly thing.' A lady once said to him she would never be happy again. 'What does that signify?' cried Jenkin; 'we are not here to be happy, but to be good.' On a friend remarking that Salvini's acting in Othello made him want to pray, Jenkin answered, 'That is prayer.'

Though admired and liked by his intimates, Jenkin was never popular with associates. His manner was hard, rasping, and unsympathetic. 'Whatever virtues he possessed,' says Mr. Stevenson, 'he could never count on being civil.' He showed so much courtesy to his wife, however, that a Styrian peasant who observed it spread a report in the village that Mrs. Jenkin, a great lady, had married beneath her. At the Savile Club, in London, he was known as the 'man who dines here and goes up to Scotland.' Jenkin was conscious of this churlishness, and latterly improved. 'All my life,' he wrote,'I have talked a good deal, with the almost unfailing result of making people sick of the sound of my tongue. It appeared to me that I had various things to say, and I had no malevolent feelings; but, nevertheless, the result was that expressed above. Well, lately some change has happened. If I talk to a person one day they must have me the next. Faces light up when they see me. "Ah! I say, come here." " Come and dine with me." It's the most preposterous thing I ever experienced. It is curiously pleasant.'

Jenkin was a good father, joining in his children's play as well as directing their studies. The boys used to wait outside his office for him at the close of business hours; and a story is told of little Frewen, the second son, entering in to him one day, while he was at work, and holding out a toy crane he was making, with the request, 'Papa you might finiss windin' this for me, I'm so very busy to-day.' He was fond of animals too, and his dog Plate regularly accompanied him to the university. But, as he used to say, 'It's a cold home where a dog is the only representative of a child.'

In the Highlands, Jenkin learned to love the Highland character and ways of life. He shot, rode and swam well, and taught his boys athletic exercises, boating, salmon fishing, and so on. He learned to dance a Highland reel, and began the study of Gaelic; but it proved too difficult for Jenkin. Once he took his family to Alt Aussee, in the Steiermark (Styria), where he hunted chamois, won a prize for shooting at the Schützenfest, learned the local dialect, sketched the neighbourhood, and danced the steirischen Ländler with the peasants.

His parents and parents-in-law had come to live in Edinburgh, but they all died within ten months of each other. Jenkin had shown great devotion to them in their illnesses, and was worn out with grief and watching. His telpherage, too, had given him considerable anxiety; and his mother's illness, which affected her mind, had caused him fear. He was planning a holiday to Italy with his wife to recuperate, and had a minor operation on his foot, which resulted in blood poisoning. There seemed to be no danger, and his wife was reading aloud to him as he lay in bed, when his mind began to wander. He probably never regained his senses before he died.

At one period of his life Jenkin was a freethinker, holding all dogmas as 'mere blind struggles to express the inexpressible.' Nevertheless, as time went on he returned to Christianity. 'The longer I live,' he wrote, 'the more convinced I become of a direct care by God—which is reasonably impossible—but there it is.' In his last year he took Communion.

== Darwin and evolution ==
In June 1867, Jenkin reviewed Darwin's On the Origin of Species (1859), in The North British Review. Jenkin criticized Darwin's evolutionary theory by suggesting that Darwin's interpretation of natural selection couldn't possibly work, as described, if the reigning hypothesis of inheritance, blending inheritance, was also valid. Though Gregor Mendel published a notion of particulate inheritance in 1866, which would eventually be developed into the dominant theory of inheritance, neither Jenkin nor Darwin would ever read it, and it would still be several decades before the blending inheritance model would be overturned in the scientific community. In this interim, Jenkin provided a mathematical argument, the swamping argument, that showed that under the blending inheritance model any advantageous mutations which might arise in a species would be quickly diluted out of any species after just a few generations. By contrast, Darwin's interpretation of natural selection required hundreds, if not thousands of generations of passing down such mutations in order to work. Jenkin thus concluded that natural selection could not possibly work if blending inheritance were also true. Despite Jenkin's argument containing a mistake, as A.S. Davis pointed out in 1871, it did not affect Jenkin's conclusion, nor mitigate the damage of Jenkin's criticisms of Darwin's ideas during the few decades when blending inheritance was still widely accepted.

Jenkin also referred to the related topic, the age of Earth. Kelvin had calculated that Fourier's theory of heat and the actions of tides on the earth's rotation allowed for an earth no more than 100 million years old and doubted in so far the case for evolution based on the chronology. Criticism by Jenkin and A.W. Bennett, in fact, led Darwin to investigate and discuss the mechanism of inheritance more thoroughly. Darwin avoided a direct confrontation (as well in the case of chronology), but confessed that some of Jenkin's arguments were troubling—so troubling, in fact, that Darwin largely abandoned blending inheritance as the potential mechanism for his own inheritance model, pangenesis, in favor of a competing model of inheritance that derived from Lamarckism.

== Selected works of Fleeming Jenkin ==
- 1868: The Atomic Theory of Lucretius, North British Review, link from Wikisource.
- 1868. "Trades Unions: How Far Legitimate?" North British Review, March. (see Papers, Literary, Scientific &c, volume 2).
- 1870. "The Graphical Representation of the Laws of Supply and Demand, and their Application to Labour," in Alexander Grant, ed., Recess Studies, ch. VI, pp. 151–85. Edinburgh. Scroll to chapter link.
- 1872. On the principles which regulate the incidence of taxes, Proceedings of the Royal Society of Edinburgh 1871-2, pp. 618–30.
- 1877: (with J.A. Ewing) On Friction between Surfaces moving at Low Speeds, Philosophical Magazine Series 5, volume 4, pp 308–10, link from Biodiversity Heritage Library.
- 1887: Sydney Colvin & James Alfred Ewing editors, Papers, Literary, Scientific, &c, volume 1, preview from Google Books.
- 1887: S.C. Colvin & J.A. Ewing editors, Papers, Literary, Scientific, &c, v. 2
- 1873: Electricity and Magnetism (first edition), link from HathiTrust, other editions in 1876,79,80,81,85,87,1914.
- 1873 (editor) Reports of the Committee on Electrical Standards appointed by the British Association for the Advancement of Science link from HathiTrust.
- undated: "History of Bridges", Encyclopædia Britannica
