= Blending inheritance =

Obsolete theory of genetics

Flowers would converge to a single coloration in a few generations if inheritance blended the characteristics of the two parents.

Blending inheritance is an obsolete theory in biology from the 19th century. The theory is that the progeny inherits any characteristic as the average of the parents' values of that characteristic. As an example of this, a crossing of a red flower variety with a white variety of the same species would yield pink-flowered offspring.

Charles Darwin's theory of inheritance by pangenesis, with contributions to egg or sperm from every part of the body, implied blending inheritance. His reliance on this mechanism led Fleeming Jenkin to attack Darwin's theory of natural selection on the grounds that blending inheritance would average out any novel beneficial characteristic before selection had time to act.

Blending inheritance was discarded with the general acceptance of particulate inheritance during the development of modern genetics, after c. 1900.

== History ==
Diagram of Charles Darwin's pangenesis theory. Every part of the body emits tiny particles, gemmules, which migrate to the gonads and contribute to the fertilised egg and so to the next generation. The theory implied that changes to the body during an organism's life would be inherited, as proposed in Lamarckism, and that inheritance would be blending.

=== Darwin's pangenesis ===
Charles Darwin developed his theory of evolution by natural selection on the basis of an understanding of uniform processes in geology, acting over very long periods of time on inheritable variation within populations. One of those processes was competition for resources, as Thomas Malthus had indicated, leading to a struggle to survive and to reproduce. Since some individuals would by chance have traits that allowed them to leave more offspring, those traits would tend to increase in the population. Darwin assembled many lines of evidence to show that variation occurred and that artificial selection by animal and plant breeding had caused change. All of this demanded a reliable mechanism of inheritance.

Pangenesis was Aristotle's attempt to provide such a mechanism of inheritance. The idea was that each part of the parent's body emitted tiny particles called gemmules, which migrated through the body to contribute to that parent's gametes, their eggs or sperms. The theory had an intuitive appeal, as characteristics of all parts of the body, such as shape of nose, width of shoulders and length of legs are inherited from both the father and the mother. However, it had some serious weaknesses. Firstly, many characteristics can change during an individual's lifetime, and are affected by the environment: blacksmiths can develop strong arm muscles during their work, so the gemmules from these muscles ought to carry this acquired characteristic. That implies the Lamarckian inheritance of acquired characteristics. Secondly, the fact that the gemmules were supposed to mix together on fertilisation implies blending inheritance, namely that the offspring would all be intermediate between the father and the mother in every characteristic. That directly contradicts the observed facts of inheritance, not least that children are usually either male or female rather than all intersex, and that traits such as flower colour often re-emerge after a generation, even when they seem to disappear when two varieties are crossed. Darwin was aware of both these objections, and accordingly had strong doubts about blending inheritance, as evidenced in his private correspondence. In a letter to T.H. Huxley, dated November 12, 1857, Darwin wrote:

I have lately been inclined to speculate very crudely & indistinctly, that propagation by true fertilisation, will turn out to be a sort of mixture & not true fusion, of two distinct individuals, or rather of innumerable individuals, as each parent has its parents & ancestors:— I can understand on no other view the way in which crossed forms go back to so large an extent to ancestral forms."

Blending inheritance leads to the averaging out of every characteristic, which as the engineer Fleeming Jenkin pointed out, would make natural selection impossible if blending were the mechanism of inheritance.

In a letter to Alfred Wallace, dated February 6, 1866, Darwin mentioned conducting hybridization experiments with pea plants, not unlike those done by Gregor Mendel, and like him obtaining segregating (unblended) varieties, effectively disproving his theory of pangenesis with blending:

I do not think you understand what I mean by the non-blending of certain varieties. It does not refer to fertility; an instance I will explain. I crossed the Painted Lady and Purple sweetpeas, which are very differently coloured varieties, and got, even out of the same pod, both varieties perfect but not intermediate. Something of this kind I should think must occur at least with your butterflies & the three forms of Lythrum; tho' those cases are in appearance so wonderful. I do not know that they are really more so than every female in the world producing distinct male and female offspring...

Blending inheritance was also clearly incompatible with Darwin's theory of evolution by natural selection. The engineer Fleeming Jenkin used this to attack natural selection in his 1867 review of Darwin's On the Origin of Species. Jenkin noted that if inheritance were by blending, any beneficial trait that might arise in a lineage would have "blended away" long before natural selection had time to act. The evolutionary biologist Richard Dawkins commented that blending inheritance was observably wrong, as it implied that every generation would be more uniform than the one before, and that Darwin should have said as much to Jenkin. The problem was not with natural selection, but with blending, and in Dawkins's view, Darwin should have settled for saying that the mechanism of inheritance was unknown, but certainly non-blending.

=== Replacement by Mendelian inheritance ===
A Punnett square for one of Mendel's pea plant experiments - self-fertilization of the F1 generation, shows that inheritance is particulate, not blending.

Blending inheritance was dismissed by the eventual widespread acceptance, after his death, of Gregor Mendel's theory of particulate inheritance, which he had presented in Experiments on Plant Hybridization (1865). In 1892, August Weismann set out the idea of a hereditary material, which he called the germ plasm, confined to the gonads and independent of the rest of the body (the soma). In Weismann's view, the germ plasm formed the body, but the body did not influence the germ plasm, except indirectly by natural selection. This contradicted both Darwin's pangenesis and Lamarckian inheritance. Mendel's work was rediscovered in 1900 by the geneticist Hugo de Vries and others, soon confirmed that same year by experiments by William Bateson. Mendelian inheritance with segregating, particulate alleles came to be understood as the explanation for both discrete and continuously varying characteristics. (Note: Blending inheritance has sometimes been wrongly identified with the continuous inheritance advocated by the biometricians at the start of the 20th century. There were indeed disagreements between them and the early Mendelians, but these did not concern blending.)

== See also ==
- Aristotle's biology
- Incomplete dominance

== Sources ==
- Bowler, Peter J. (1983). The Eclipse of Darwinism: anti-Darwinian evolutionary theories in the decades around 1900. Johns Hopkins University Press. ISBN 978-0-8018-4391-4.
- Bowler, Peter J. (1989). Evolution: The History of an Idea (2nd revised ed.). Berkeley, CA: University of California Press. ISBN 978-0-520-06386-0.
- Larson, Edward J. (2004). Evolution:The Remarkable History of Scientific Theory. Modern Library. ISBN 0-679-64288-9.
