= Simaság =

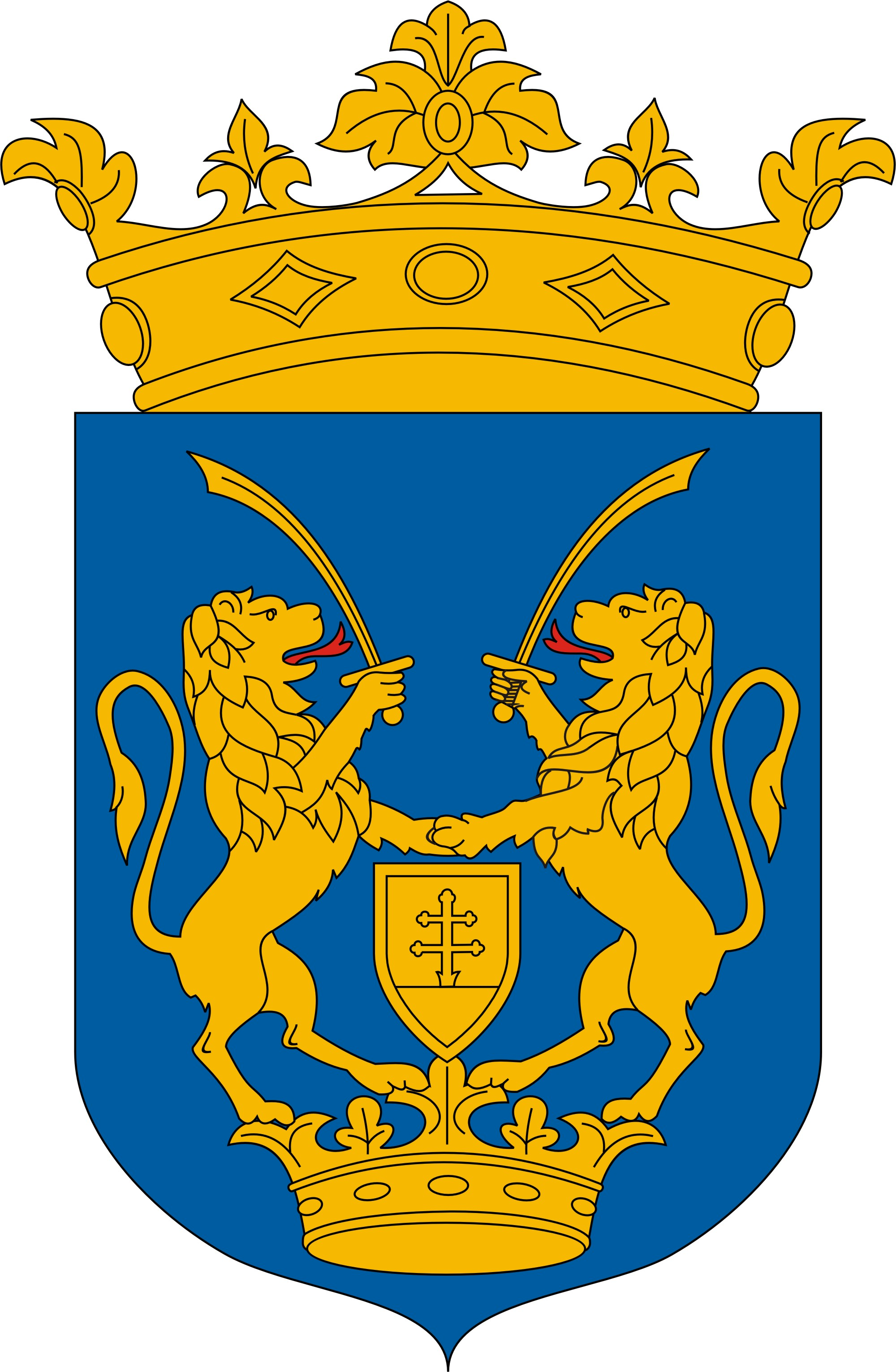
- Coat of arms

- Location of Simaság in Hungary
- Coordinates: 47°25′18.70″N 16°50′38.90″E
- Country: Hungary
- Region: Western Transdanubia
- County: Vas
- Subregion: Csepregi
- Rank: Village

Area
  - Total: 10.14 km^{2} (3.92 sq mi)

Population (1 January 2008)
  - Total: 552
  - Density: 54.4/km^{2} (141/sq mi)
- Time zone: UTC+1 (CET)
  - Summer (DST): UTC+2 (CEST)
- Postal code: 9633
- Area code: +36 94
- KSH code: 26763
- Website: www.simasag.hu

Simaság is a village in Vas county, Hungary.
