= Jay Clayton (critic) =

American literary critic

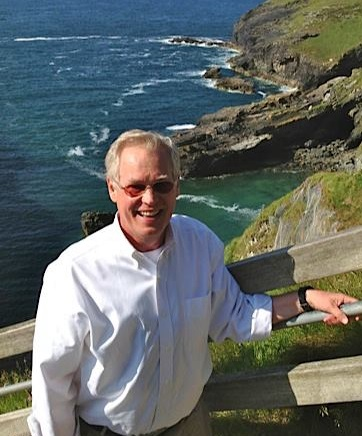
- Clayton in 2018
- Born: John Bunyan Clayton IV; 11 July 1951 (age 75); Dallas, Texas, U.S.
- Occupations: Literary critic, professor
- Spouse: Ellen Wright Clayton (m. 1982)

Academic background
- Education: Yale University (BA); University of Virginia (PhD)

Academic work
- Institutions: University of Wisconsin–Madison; Vanderbilt University
- Main interests: Literature, Science, Technology

John Bunyan Clayton IV (born July 11, 1951) is an American literary critic who is known for his work on the relationship between nineteenth-century culture and postmodernism. He has published influential works on Romanticism and the novel, Neo-Victorian literature, steampunk, hypertext fiction, online games, contemporary American fiction, technology in literature, and genetics in literature and film. He is the William R. Kenan, Jr. Professor of English, Cinema and Media Arts, and Communication of Science, Engineering, and Technology at Vanderbilt University.

== Academic career ==
Clayton attended Highland Park High School in Dallas, Texas and The Hill School, in Pottstown, Pennsylvania, before going on to receive his B.A. from Yale University. He earned his Ph.D. from the University of Virginia in 1979. He taught English at the University of Wisconsin–Madison before moving to Vanderbilt University in 1988. He received a Guggenheim Fellowship in 1999. As chair of the English department at Vanderbilt from 2003 to 2010, he helped recruit renowned professors to the university. From 2012–22, he was director of the Curb Center for Art, Enterprise, and Public Policy at Vanderbilt.

His first book Romantic Vision and the Novel, published by Cambridge University Press in 1987, compared Victorian realist fiction with romantic poetry. It proposed a theory of Romantic visionary moments in nineteenth-century English fiction as lyric disruptions of the narrative line.

His book on multiculturalism in American fiction and theory, Pleasures of Babel: Contemporary American Literature and Theory, published by Oxford University Press in 1993, was selected by Choice as An Outstanding Academic Book for 1995. Surveying American fiction and literary theory from the 1970s–1990s, Clayton argued for the political and social power of narratives.

His best known book, Charles Dickens in Cyberspace: The Afterlife of the Nineteenth Century in Postmodern Culture, was published by Oxford University Press in 2003. It won the Suzanne M. Glasscock Humanities Book Prize for Interdisciplinary Scholarship in 2004. Moving from Jane Austen and Charles Dickens to William Gibson and Neal Stephenson, Clayton shows how Victorian literature and technology reverberates in contemporary American culture. His most recent book, Literature, Science, and Public Policy: From Darwin to Genomics (Cambridge University Press, 2023), shows how literature can influence public policy concerning scientific controversies in genetics and other areas.

Clayton was an early adopter of digital approaches to pedagogy, teaching classes on hypertext and computer games beginning in 1996. In 2013, he launched a highly successful MOOC on the Coursera platform titled "Online Games: Literature, New Media, and Narrative," which has reached over 85,000 students from more than 120 countries around the world. More recently, his classes have focused on literature, genetics, and science policy.

== Publications ==
=== Books ===
- Clayton, Jay (2023). Literature, Science, and Public Policy: From Darwin to Genomics. Cambridge University Press. doi:10.1017/9781009263504. ISBN 978-1-009-26350-4.
- Charles Dickens in Cyberspace: The Afterlife of the Nineteenth Century in Postmodern Culture. Oxford University Press. 2003.
- The Pleasures of Babel: Contemporary American Literature and Theory. Oxford University Press. 1993.
- Romantic Vision and the Novel. Cambridge University Press. 1987.

=== Edited collections ===
- Clayton, Jay; King, Claire Sisco, eds. (2022). Fictions of Genetic Privacy. Journal of Literature and Science. Vol. 14. doi:10.12929/jls.14.1-2.
- Wald, Priscilla; Clayton, Jay, eds. (2007). Genomics in Literature, Visual Arts, and Culture. Literature and Medicine. Vol. 26. Johns Hopkins University Press. doi:10.1353/lm.2008.0009.
- Hirsch, Marianne; Clayton, Jay; Newman, Karen, eds. (2002). Time and the Literary. Essays from the English Institute. Routledge.
- Clayton, Jay; Rothstein, Eric, eds. (1991). Influence and Intertextuality in Literary History. University of Wisconsin Press.
- Clayton, Jay; Draine, Betsy, eds. (1988). Contemporary Literature and Contemporary Theory. Vol. 29. University of Wisconsin Press. JSTOR i251732.

=== Selected articles ===
- Lillydahl, Alice; Clayton, Jay (2025). "'DNA Doesn't Lie': Genetic Essentialism and Determinism in Law and Order: Special Victims Unit". Journal of Medical Humanities. doi:10.1007/s10912-024-09923-4. PMID 39853551.
- Grimsted, Sonora R.; Krizner, Katerina G.; Porter, Cynthia D.; Clayton, Jay (2024). "Genetics in the X-Men film franchise: mutants as allegories of difference". Science Fiction as a Tool in Assessing the Ethical, Legal, and Social Implications of New and Emerging Science and Technology. Frontiers in Genetics. Vol. 14. doi:10.3389/fgene.2023.1331905. PMC 10882630. PMID 38390456.
- Eilmus, Ayden; Bradley, Avery; Clayton, Jay (2023). "Autonomy and Bioethics in Fan Responses to Orphan Black". Public Understanding of Science. 32 (2): 174–188. doi:10.1177/09636625231187321. PMC 10832314. PMID 37586019.
- Clayton, Jay (2021). "Time Considered as a Helix of Infinite Possibilities". Medical Humanities. 47 (2): 185–192. doi:10.1136/medhum-2020-012063. PMC 9396530. PMID 34088802.
- Clayton, Jay (2016). "The Modern Synthesis: Genetics and Dystopia in the Huxley Circle". Modernism/Modernity. 23 (4): 875–896. doi:10.1353/mod.2016.0078.
- Clayton, J. (2013). "The Ridicule of Time: Science Fiction, Bioethics, and the Posthuman". American Literary History. 25 (2): 317–343. doi:10.1093/alh/ajt005.
- Clayton, Jay (2013). "Genome Time: Post-Darwinism, Then and Now". Critical Quarterly. 55 (1): 57–74. doi:10.1111/criq.12031.
- Clayton, Jay (2012). "Touching the Telectroscope: Haptic Communications". Journal of Victorian Culture. 17 (4): 518–523. doi:10.1080/13555502.2012.742250.
- Clayton, Jay (2012). "The Dickens Tape: Affect and Sound Reproduction in The Chimes". Dickens and Modernity. Essays and Studies. Vol. 65. Boydell and Brewer. pp. 19–40. doi:10.1515/9781782040262-005. ISBN 978-1-78204-026-2.
- Clayton, Jay (2012). "The Future of Victorian Literature". The Cambridge History of Victorian Literature. Cambridge University Press. pp. 712–729. doi:10.1017/CHOL9780521846257.035. ISBN 978-0-521-84625-7.
- "Literature and Science Policy: A New Project for the Humanities". PMLA. 124 (3): 947–949. 2009. JSTOR 25614340.
- Clayton, Jay (2007). "Victorian Chimeras, or, What Literature Can Contribute to Genetics Policy Today". New Literary History. 38 (3): 569–591. doi:10.1353/nlh.2007.0040.
- Clayton, Jay (2003). "Frankenstein's futurity: replicants and robots". The Cambridge Companion to Mary Shelley. Cambridge University Press. pp. 84–100. doi:10.1017/CCOL0521809843.006. ISBN 978-0-521-00770-2.
- Clayton, Jay (2002). "Convergence of the Two Cultures: A Geek's Guide to Contemporary Literature". American Literature. 74 (4): 807–831. doi:10.1215/00029831-74-4-807.
- "Genome Time". Time and the Literary. Routledge. 2002. pp. 31–60.
- "Hacking the Nineteenth Century". Victorian Afterlife: Postmodern Culture Rewrites the Nineteenth Century. University of Minnesota Press. 2000. pp. 186–210.
- "The Voice in the Machine: Hazlitt, Hardy, James". Language Machines: Technologies of Literary and Cultural Production. Routledge. 1997. pp. 210–232.
- "Concealed Circuits: Frankenstein's Monster, the Medusa, and the Cyborg". Raritan. 15 (4): 53–69. 1996.
- Clayton, Jay (1995). "Londublin: Dickens's London in Joyce's Dublin". Novel: A Forum on Fiction. 28 (3): 327–342. doi:10.2307/1345927. JSTOR 1345927.
- "Is Pip Postmodern? Or, Dickens at the End of the Twentieth Century". Charles Dickens's "Great Expectations". Case Studies in Contemporary Criticism. Bedford Books. 1995. pp. 606–624.
- Clayton, Jay (1993). "A Portrait of the Romantic Poet as a Young Modernist: Literary History as Textual Unconscious". Joyce: The Return of the Repressed. Cornell University Press. pp. 114–127. ISBN 978-1-5017-2292-9. JSTOR 10.7591/j.ctt207g6p1.9.
- Clayton, Jay (1991). "Dickens and the Genealogy of Postmodernism". Nineteenth Century Literature. 46 (10.2307/3045190): 181–195. doi:10.2307/3045190. JSTOR 3045190.
- "The Alphabet of Suffering: Effie Deans, Tess Durbeyfield, Martha Ray, and Hetty Sorrel". Influence and Intertextuality in Literary History. University of Wisconsin Press. 1991. pp. 37–60.
- Clayton, Jay; Rothstein, Eric (1991). "Figures In the Corpus: Theories of Influence and Intertextuality". Influence and Intertextuality in Literary History. University of Wisconsin Press. pp. 3–36.
- Clayton, Jay (1990). "The Narrative Turn in Recent Minority Fiction". American Literary History. 2 (3): 375–393. doi:10.1093/alh/2.3.375. JSTOR 489946.
- Clayton, Jay (1989). "Narrative and Theories of Desire". Critical Inquiry. 16 (1): 33–53. doi:10.1086/448525. JSTOR 1343625.
- Clayton, Jay (1979). "Visionary Power and Narrative Form: Wordsworth and Adam Bede". ELH. 46 (4): 645–672. doi:10.2307/2872483. JSTOR 2872483.

== Awards ==
- 2016, Distinguished Visiting Fellow, Queen Mary University, London
- 2014, Harvie Branscomb Distinguished Professor Award, Vanderbilt University
- 2005, Suzanne M. Glasscock Humanities Book Prize for Interdisciplinary Scholarship
- 1999, John Simon Guggenheim Fellowship
- 1996–99, The English Institute Board of Supervisors
- 1997, Spence Lee Wilson and Rebecca Webb Fellow, Robert Penn Warren Center for Humanities
- 1995–96, president, Society for the Study of Narrative Literature
- 1988, Robert A. Partlow Award, The Dickens Society
- 1986, Distinguished Teaching Award, University of Wisconsin
- 1981, American Council of Learned Societies Fellowship
