= Mary Mallon =

Irish-American cook and typhoid fever carrier

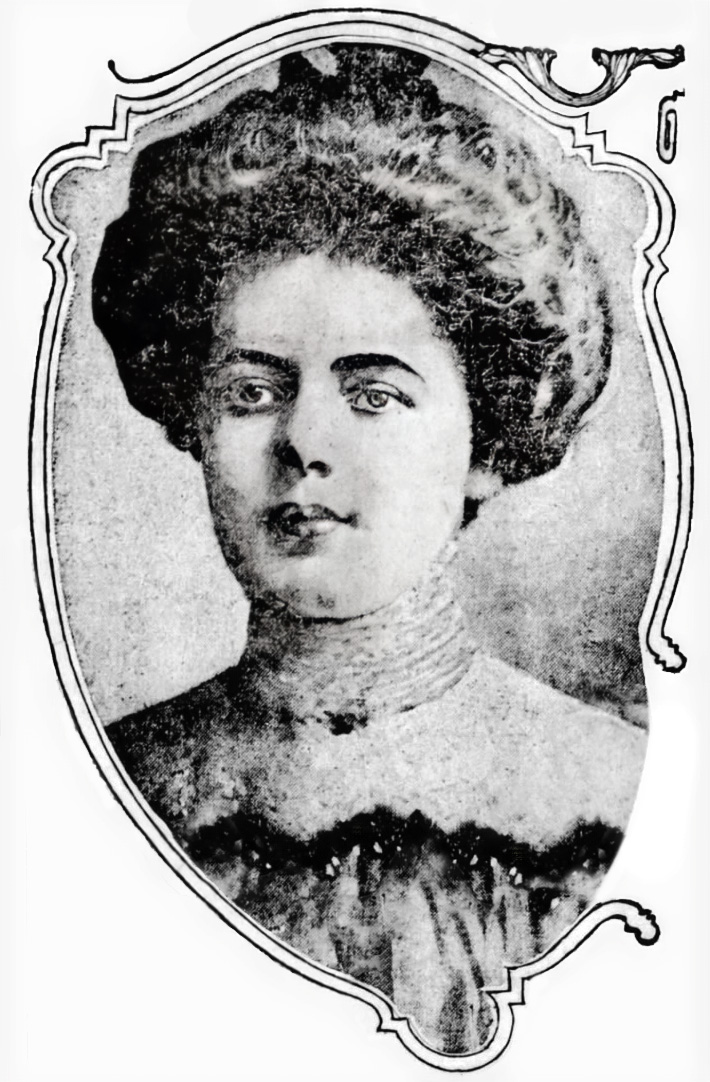
- Mallon, c. 1909
- Born: September 23, 1869; Cookstown, County Tyrone, Ireland
- Died: November 11, 1938 (aged 69); North Brother Island, New York, US
- Resting place: Saint Raymond's Cemetery, New York, US
- Other name: Typhoid Mary
- Occupation: Cook

Mary Mallon (September 23, 1869 – November 11, 1938), commonly known as Typhoid Mary, was an Irish-born cook who lived in the United States from a young age and is believed to have infected up to fifty-seven people with the bacteria that cause typhoid fever. The infections caused three confirmed deaths. She was the first person in the U.S. to be identified as an asymptomatic carrier of Salmonella typhi bacteria.

Between 1897 and 1907, Mallon worked at the houses of several New York–based families; members of four of the households contracted typhoid. An investigation by George Soper, an epidemiologist at the New York Department of Health, identified Mallon as the potential disease vector. In 1907, she was forcibly quarantined at the Riverside Hospital, an institution for those with quarantinable diseases, on North Brother Island in New York City's East River. She was released in 1910 after she swore to report to the health department every quarter and not return to cooking as a career.

A further typhoid outbreak at the Sloane Maternity Hospital in early 1915 resulted in twenty-five cases and two deaths. Mallon was identified as the responsible party and was returned to North Brother Island. She remained there until her death in 1938. Her nickname, coined by officials at the health department, became a colloquial term for anyone who spreads disease.

Mallon's case raises ethical questions about the balance between protection of individual liberty and the requirements of public health. She was treated differently from the four hundred other asymptomatic typhoid carriers identified during her confinement. Others who worked in the food industry were given jobs and had their rents paid for by the state, and none were confined for the same length of time as she was. Her story has been reexamined and reevaluated, particularly during outbreaks of HIV/AIDS, tuberculosis, and COVID-19.

== Biography ==
=== Early life, 1869–1897 ===
Mary Mallon was born on September 23, 1869, in Cookstown, County Tyrone, in the north of the island of Ireland, to John Mallon and Catherine Igo. The level of Mary's education is not known, although she had some schooling. In 1883, when she was about fifteen, she emigrated to the United States aboard the steamship Ethiopia. In New York City, she first lived with an aunt. (Note: Microbiologist Richard Adler and epidemiologist Elise Mara, in their biography of Mallon, observe that ship records state her age as seventeen.) Mallon was soon employed as a private cook with a series of wealthy New York families; she gained a favorable reputation for her work and earned good wages. Some of her positions were as live-in staff; for others she lived with friends, including a Mr. A. Briehof. Her biographer, Judith Walzer Leavitt, observed that Mallon's career pattern reflected the restricted range of employment opportunities available to unmarried women of her ethnic background and socioeconomic status.

=== Early career, 1897–1906 ===
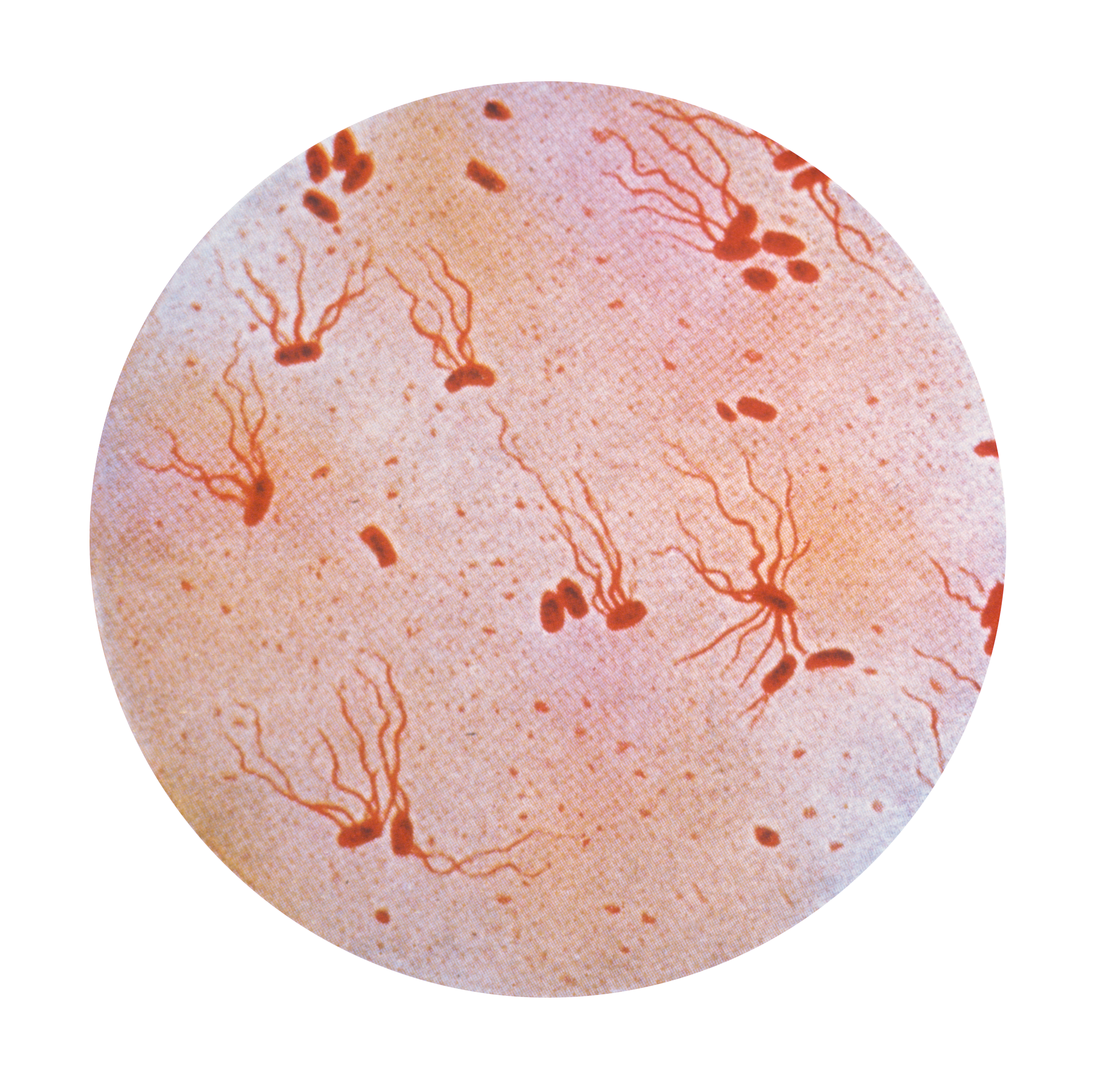
Salmonella enterica (full name: "Salmonella enterica serotype Typhi") bacteria, the cause of typhoid fever

Between 1897 and 1906, Mallon worked as a cook for several families, members of four of which contracted typhoid fever. (Note: Typhoid was common in turn-of-the-century New York, with between 3,000 and 4,500 cases annually in the city. Ten percent of those infected died. In 1900, 20,000 Americans died of the disease.) From 1897 to 1900, she cooked for a family in Mamaroneck, New York; no one in the family or among the staff contracted typhoid during that time. A guest became ill with typhoid in September 1900, ten days after he arrived to stay with the family. (Note: The incubation period for typhoid is between three and thirty days, with the average being between eight and fourteen days.) He had previously been in East Hampton, where there had been an outbreak. From 1901 to 1902, Mallon worked for a family in New York for eleven months. The family's laundress checked in to the hospital on December 9, 1901, with typhoid.

Mallon worked for lawyer and socialite J. Coleman Drayton in 1902, while he and his family spent the summer in Dark Harbor, Maine. Four family members and five staff members became ill; only Drayton and Mallon were unaffected. She stayed with the family to help nurse the sick, for which Drayton paid her a bonus of $50. (Note: $50 in 1902 equates to approximately $2,000 in 2025, based on the United States Consumer Price Index measure of inflation.) Two doctors, Edwin Daniels of Boston and Louis Starr of Philadelphia, investigated the matter and came to the conclusion that the footman—a household servant who served meals—was the person who carried the typhoid.

In mid-1904, Mallon was cooking for Henry Gilsey and his family at their summer house in Sands Point. Four members of the staff—who lived separately from the family—became ill with typhoid, but none of the family did. (Note: Sources differ on how long Mallon worked for the Gilseys. Adler and Mara state that Mallon began work on June 1, with the first infection following a week later. Leavitt writes that the outbreak was "nine months following Mary Mallon's employment".) Robert Wilson, the superintendent of hospitals for communicable diseases for the New York City Department of Health, investigated. He believed the laundress was the source of the outbreak but could not prove it.

Mallon worked as a cook for Charles Henry Warren, a New York banker in 1906. He and his family spent the summer that year at Oyster Bay on the North Shore of Long Island, where they had rented a house from George Thompson. On August 27, one of Warren's daughters was incapacitated with typhoid, and five other family members out of eleven also became sick. All recovered.

=== Identified as a typhoid carrier, 1906–1909 ===
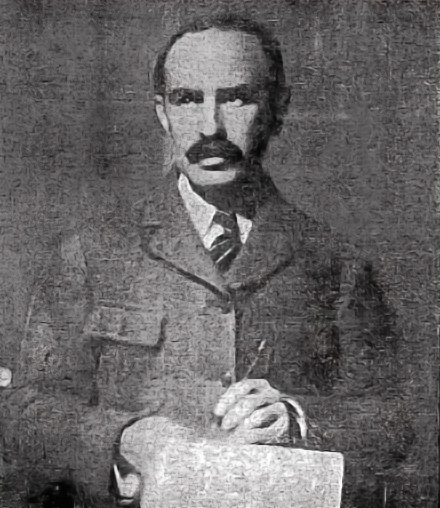
George Soper, c. 1915

Thompson was concerned that he would not be able to rent out his property again, and he hired George Soper, a sanitation engineer and epidemiologist for the New York Department of Health, to investigate the source of the problem. Soper was a renowned investigator and was referred to as an "epidemic fighter", according to microbiologist Richard Adler and epidemiologist Elise Mara. In the first phase of his investigation, Soper eliminated the standard causes of typhoid: contact with infected people and contamination of the food, water, and milk supplies. Questioning the household, he found that Mallon joined the staff on August 4 and left three weeks after the outbreak. At first, he was unsure whether a cook could be the source, since cooking would kill the bacteria; he became more convinced, however, when he learned that Mallon prepared an ice cream dessert with fresh peaches. According to Leavitt, this dish "would have been an excellent medium for typhoid infection".

Mrs. Warren told Soper that Mallon had been hired from Mrs. Stricker's employment agency. (Note: Adler and Mara think it is likely that this agency was "Mrs. R. Stricker and Nephew", which was located at 40 East 28th Street.) The agency described Mallon as "an Irish woman about 40 years of age, tall, heavy, single. She seemed to be in perfect health." They provided Soper with a copy of Mallon's employment history and he mapped this to known typhoid cases. He saw she had worked for eight families, seven of whom had suffered typhoid outbreaks. He identified twenty-six cases of typhoid that were connected to Mallon. Leavitt writes: "This number is actually quite small and indicates that many of the people for whom Mallon cooked during these years may have already been immune to typhoid". Soper was aware of the existence of asymptomatic carriers—carriers that are infected with a pathogen, but show no signs or symptoms—as he was well versed in much of the European literature on the subject. He developed the hypothesis that Mallon was a healthy carrier of typhoid and wished to gain samples from her to test his idea.

Locations where Mallon worked or lived. 1) Mamaroneck 2) East Hampton 3) Sands Point 4) Oyster Bay 5) Tuxedo Park 6) New York 7) North Brother Island 8) Newfoundland 9) Marblehead 10) Dark Harbor

While Soper was conducting his investigation, Mallon continued working. In September and October 1906, she cooked for the family of George Kessler in their Tuxedo Park home. Two weeks after her arrival, the laundress contracted typhoid. There had been no cases of the disease in Tuxedo Park around that time and all the other staff had worked for the family for a long period. In November or December 1906, Mallon started cooking at the Park Avenue residence of Walter Bowen. On January 23, 1907, a chambermaid contracted typhoid. Bowen's daughter also fell ill with the disease and died; she was the first person connected to Mallon who was known to have died.

Soper visited Mallon in March 1907 at the Kessler house. He explained the situation to her and told her that he needed samples of her blood, urine, and feces. According to Soper:

It did not take Mary long to react to this suggestion. She seized a carving fork and advanced in my direction. I passed rapidly down the long narrow hall, through the tall iron gate, out through the area and so to the sidewalk. I felt rather lucky to escape.

Soper—with his colleague B. Raymond Hoobler—then visited Mallon at her rooming house on Third Avenue that she shared with Briehof. Soper recalled, "Mary was angry at the unexpected sight of me". He tried again to explain the situation but he had no success in persuading her. When the two men left, they were "followed by a volley of imprecations from the head of the stairs". Mallon's refusal was based on her belief that she was not infected.

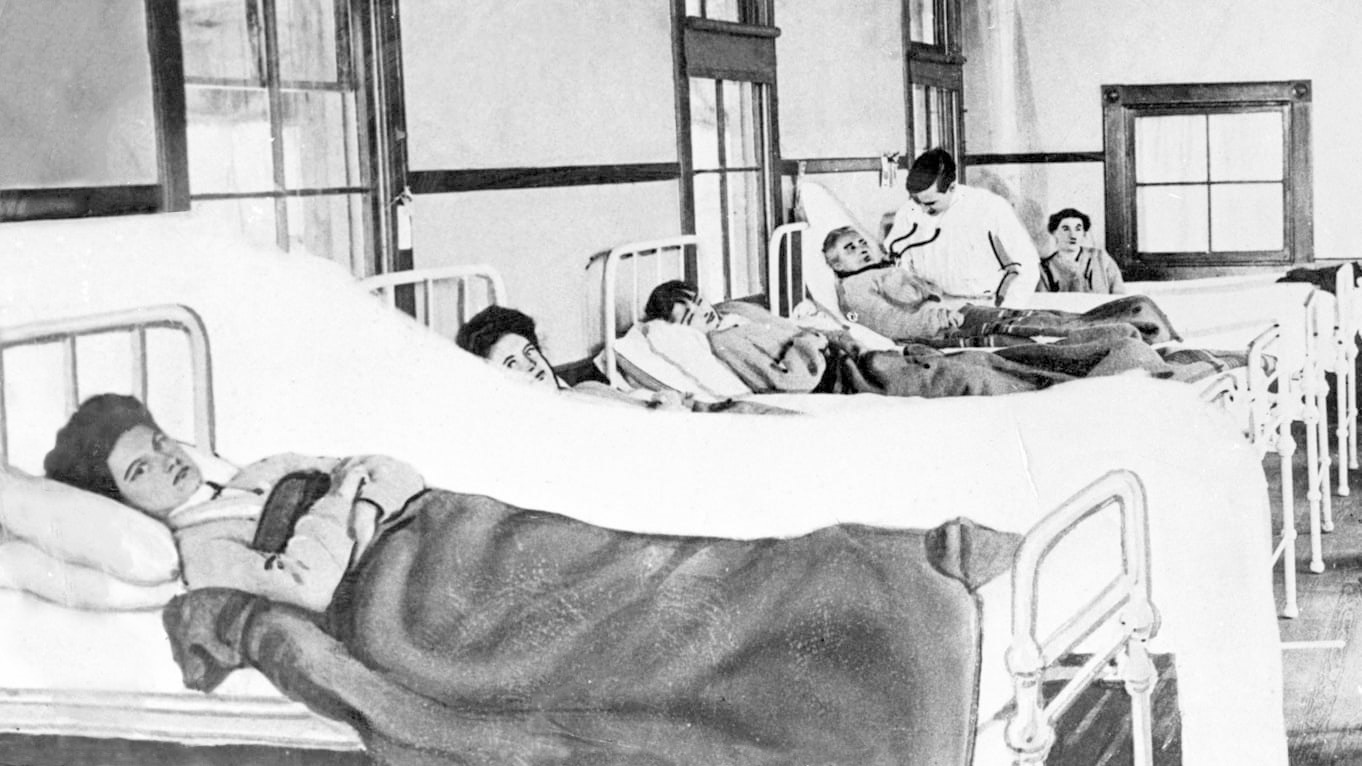
Mallon, nearest the camera, in hospital

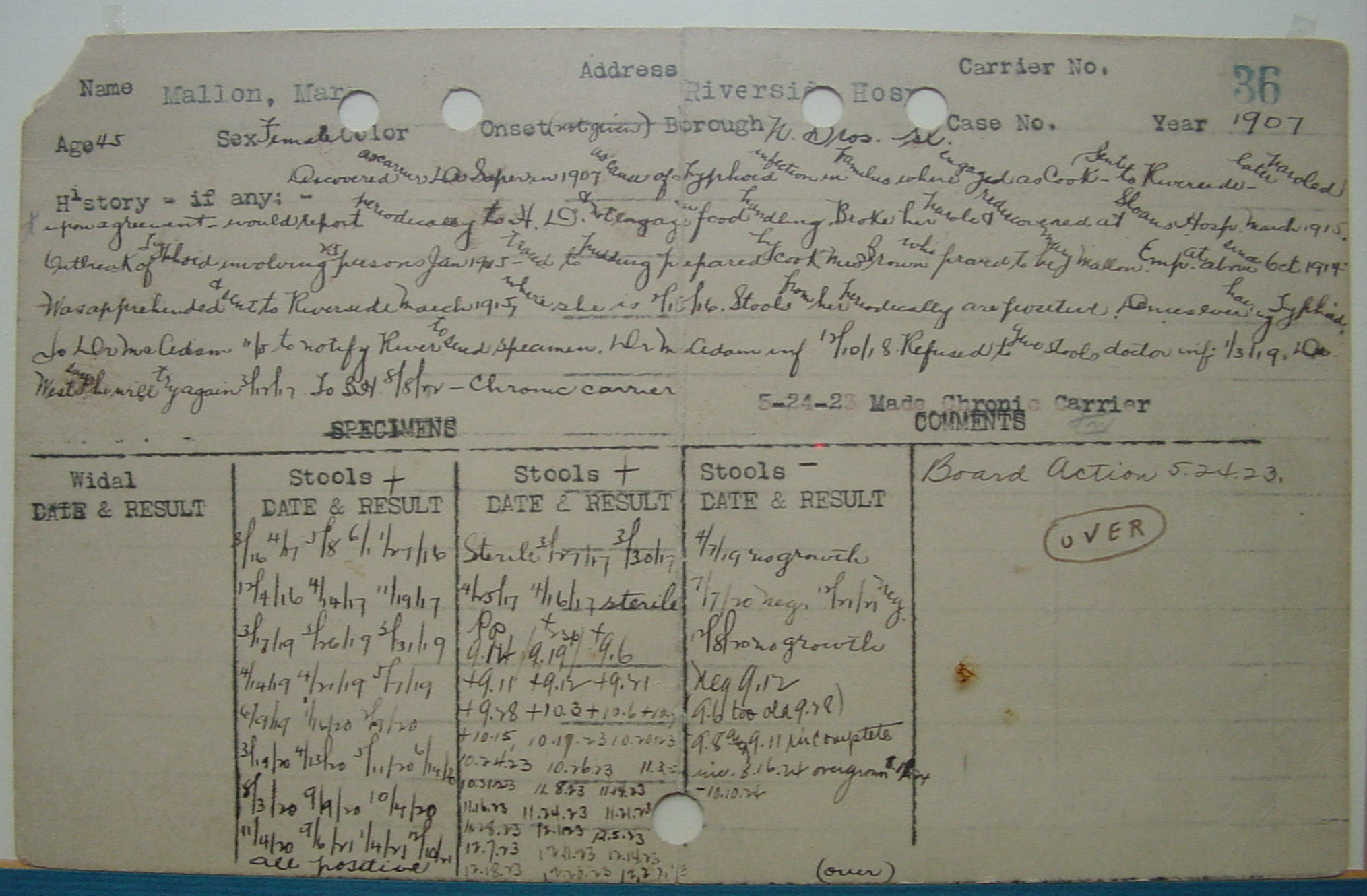
Mallon's stool report

Soper reported to his superiors and recommended that Mallon be arrested to facilitate sampling of her stool for testing. A female doctor and an inspector from the health department, Sara Josephine Baker, were sent to try to persuade Mallon. This also ended in failure, so Baker returned the following day, March 20, 1907, accompanied by the police. Mallon answered the door with a long serving fork in her hand; she lunged towards the visitors then ran out of the back of the house, hiding in a garden shed. Baker described the attempt: "Mary was on the lookout and peered out, a long kitchen fork in her hand like a rapier." She was found in the shed and again resisted: Baker reported that "She came out fighting and swearing, both of which she could do with appalling efficiency and vigor." She was placed in an ambulance and taken to Willard Parker Hospital. To stop her struggles, Baker had to sit on her chest for the journey.

Mallon was kept at Willard Parker for several months. Her stools were tested three times a week and showed the presence of Bacillus typhosus. The condition proved resistant to different drug treatments and Mallon refused to consider allowing the removal of her gallbladder, the primary organ where the typhoid bacillus is held in the body. (Note: Historian Alan M. Kraut observes that Mallon was probably wise to turn down the operation. The New York Department of Health removed the gallbladders of five other patients; none were cured of typhoid. While the gallbladder is the primary reservoir for the typhoid bacillus, it is not the only one; the urinary system, including the kidneys, can also hold the bacillus.) It was enough proof for the Health Department to transfer her to the Riverside Hospital, an institution for those with quarantinable diseases, on North Brother Island. She remained there for three years, living on her own in a small cottage next to the hospital; she was allowed to walk around the island and had access to many of the facilities including the chapel.

=== Release from North Brother Island, 1909–1915 ===
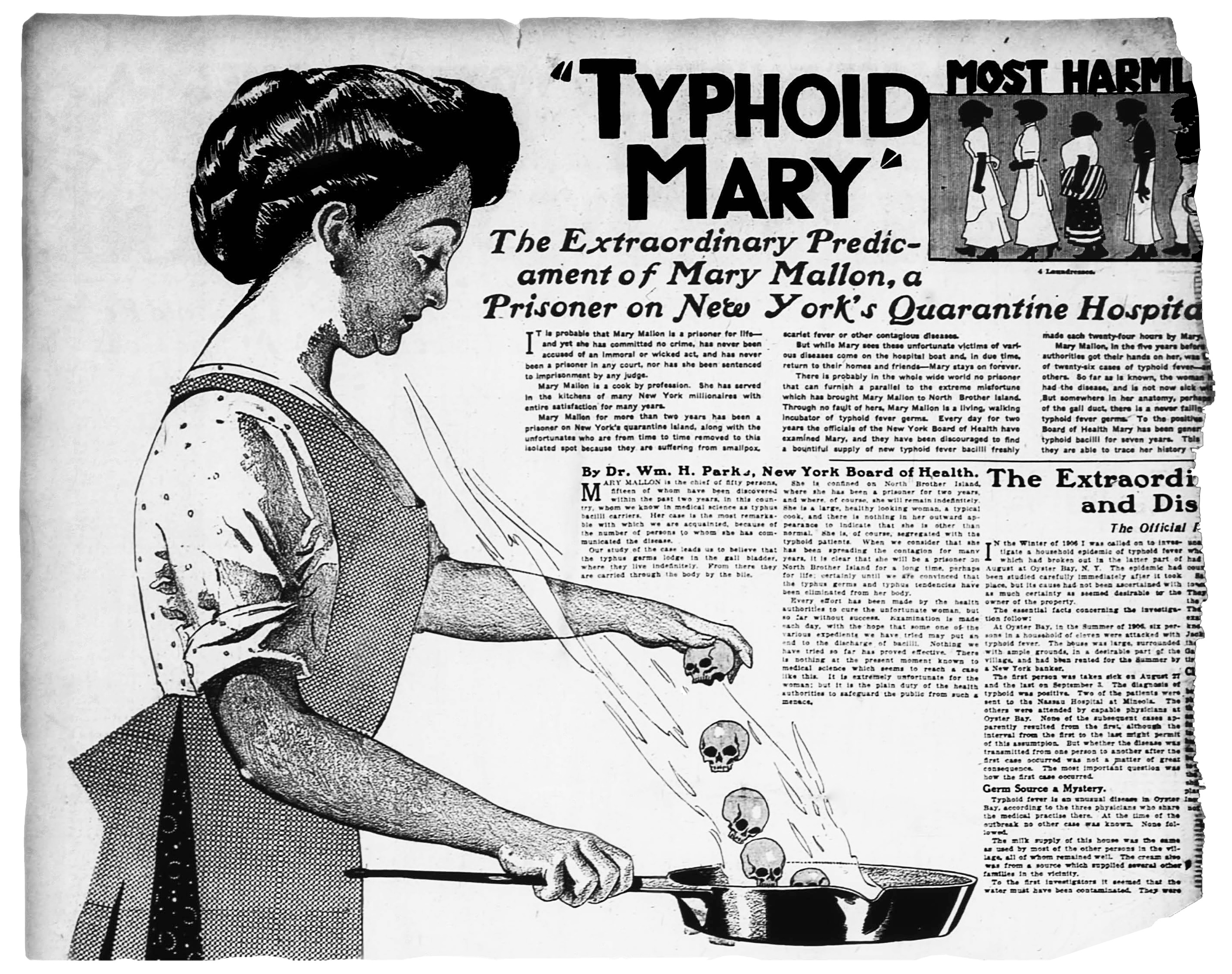
Article from the June 20, 1909, issue of the New York American, showing Mallon adding skulls to a frying pan

In 1909, Mallon challenged in court her extended captivity. Leavitt believes that William Randolph Hearst's newspaper, the New York American, provided the funds to pay for her lawyer, George Francis O'Neill. He filed a writ of habeas corpus in an attempt to free her. Mallon came to public notice because of the case and the exposure she received in the New York American. The newspaper published a story about her on June 20, 1909, in which they called her "'Typhoid Mary', most harmless and yet the most dangerous woman in America"; her nickname had been given to her by officials at the health department and was then used by journalists. (Note: Anglicist Priscilla Wald suggests the official may have been Milton J. Rosenau, at the June 1909 annual meeting of the American Medical Association.) In an article published on June 30, in the New York American, they called for "pity for the lone woman who has not a relative or friend to whom she can turn". Mallon's case was heard in late June and early July 1909 in front of judges Mitchell Erlanger and Leonard Giegerich. The decision was handed down in mid-July: Mallon continued to be confined to the hospital. Their decision was based on the 1905 U.S. Supreme Court decision in Jacobson v. Massachusetts, in which the court supported the authority of states to enforce compulsory vaccination laws to protect the public.

In 1910, Ernst J. Lederle was appointed as the new commissioner for health for New York. On February 19, he released her from her enforced stay on North Brother Island. She signed an agreement to report to the health department every quarter and that she would not return to cooking as a career, which the department felt was sufficient to ensure she would not spread typhoid to others. Lederle explained:

She has been released because she has been shut up long enough to learn the precautions that she ought to take. As long she observes them I have little fear that she will be a danger to her neighbors. The chief points that she must observe are personal cleanliness and the keeping away from the preparation of other persons' food. ... She has promised to report to me regularly and not to take another position as a cook.

Lederle found Mallon a job in a laundry once she left. According to Leavitt, Mallon avoided cooking as a career until at least December 1911 and possibly to September 1912. By November 1914, the Department of Health had lost track of her whereabouts. The health department thought she had cooked at a New Jersey inn in 1913 and 1914; Soper claimed she had been cooking for families, including one in Newfoundland, New Jersey, over the same years, and that six more typhoid cases were connected to this, but he provided no evidence. Historian Alan M. Kraut writes she was "definitely linked" to an outbreak in New Jersey and that there is a possibility she was connected to more cases in Marblehead, Massachusetts. Leavitt states the earliest confirmed instance of Mallon being employed as a cook after her release from North Brother Island was in October 1914, when she was hired under the name Mary Brown by the Sloane Maternity Hospital. In January and February 1915, the hospital was the center of a typhoid outbreak with twenty-five cases; two people died.

=== Return to North Brother Island, 1915–1938 ===
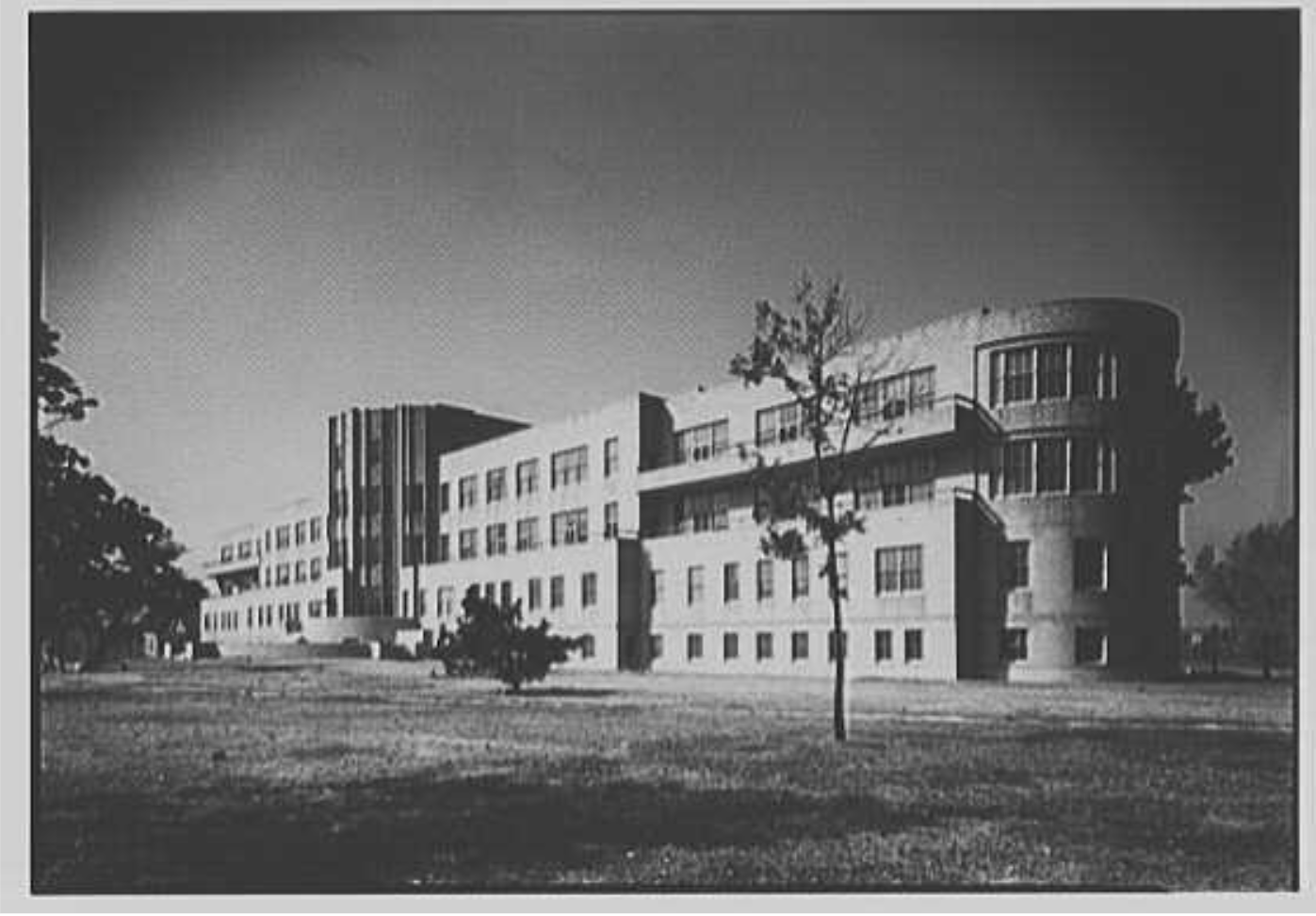
Riverside Hospital on North Brother Island, pictured in 1943

Soper was called in to investigate the hospital's outbreak and, by comparing the handwriting of "Mary Brown" with that of Mallon, realized she was responsible. She had left the hospital's employment by that time and it was not until March 1915 that she was apprehended and returned to North Brother Island.

On her return to the island, Mallon spent her time baking cakes and making jewelry from beads, both of which she would sell to other patients and staff. In 1918, she got a job in the hospital, and by 1925 she was assisting in the hospital laboratory. In 1925, physician Alexandra Plavska came to the island for an internship and hired Mallon as an assistant. Mallon's duties included general cleaning, washing bottles, recording results, and assisting with the analysis. The two became friends, according to Plavska's daughter; after Mallon was allowed to leave the island on day passes, she visited the Plavskas' home. (Note: Permission for trips off the island was granted on June 11, 1918.) Plavska left the hospital in 1927 and was replaced in 1929 by Emma Rose Goldberg. Goldberg set up a laboratory on an upper story of an unused chapel and Mallon continued there with her duties; Goldberg described her as a dependable worker who was always on time.

=== Death ===
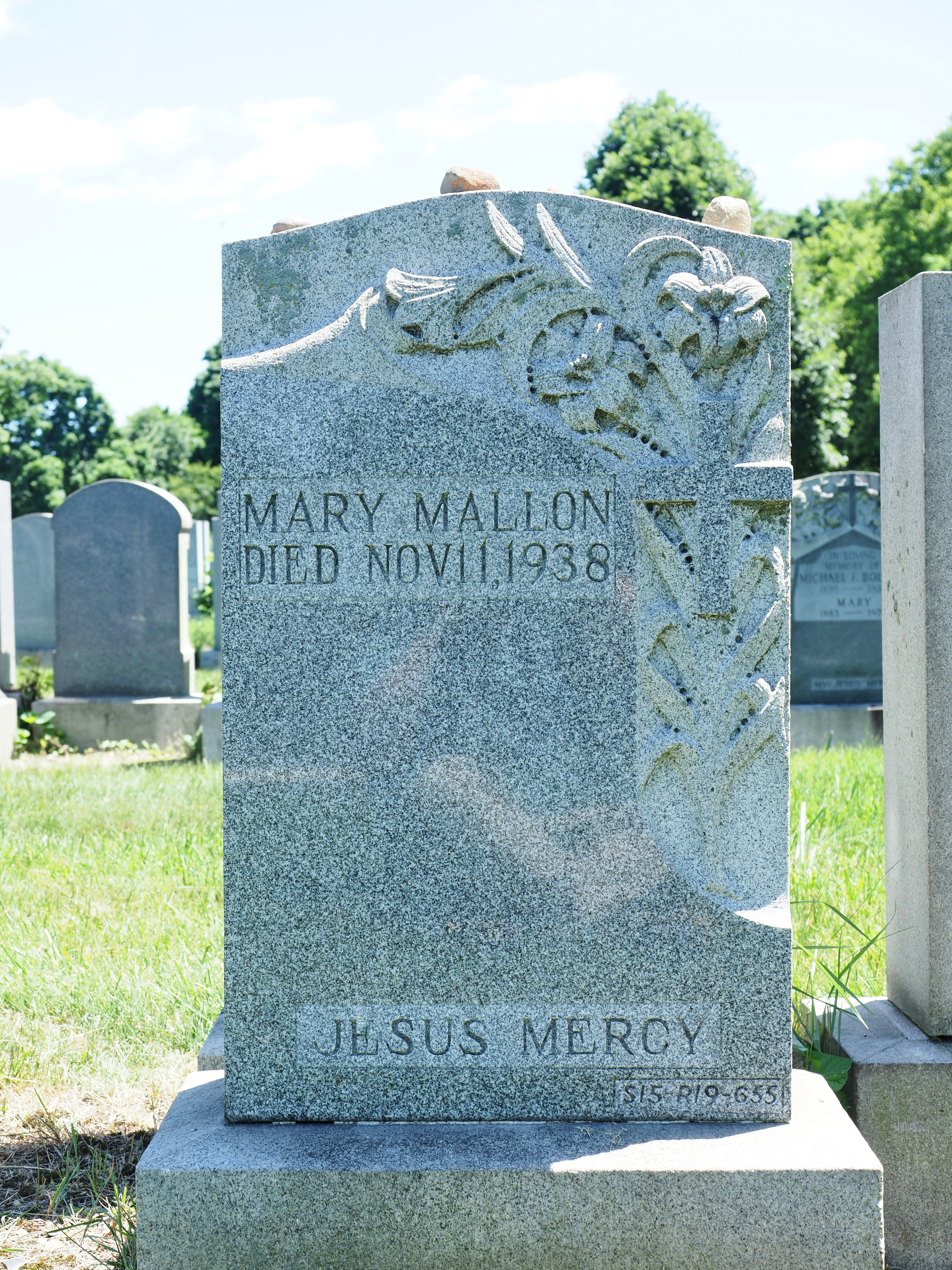
Mary Mallon's gravestone

In later life, Mallon had several small strokes. On December 4, 1932, she suffered a major one. She was transferred to a ward at the hospital and remained there paralyzed and bedridden; Plavska and her daughter were among her visitors. Mallon died on November 11, 1938. Her funeral was held at St. Luke's Church, and she was buried at Saint Raymond's Cemetery on November 13.

Medical historians Filio Marineli et al. report that an autopsy was conducted on Mallon, which showed she had Salmonella typhi bacteria in her gallstones. They also observe that other writers state no such procedure took place and that this was "another urban legend, whispered by the Health Center of Oyster Bay, in order to calm ethical reactions".

== Legacy and analysis ==
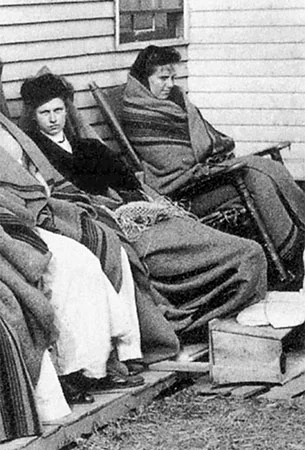
Mallon (left) on North Brother Island, 1909

Mallon was the first asymptomatic carrier of typhoid identified in the US. Up to fifty-seven cases of typhoid and three deaths from the disease were connected to her. (Note: Sources differ on the final number of cases Mallon caused, with forty-seven being one figure given and fifty-three another.) Mallon was treated differently from the other carriers who evaded their restrictions. She was described as a "menace to public health"; her gender, class and Irish background were all factors that weighed against her. Soper wrote that she lacked femininity, a characterization that was repeated in the press. He wrote:

Nothing was so distinctive about her as her walk, unless it was her mind. The two had a peculiarity in common. Those who knew her best in the long years of her custody said Mary walked more like a man than a woman and that her mind had a distinctly masculine character, also.

Although she was not the only asymptomatic carrier identified in early twentieth century New York, she was the only one confined indefinitely. One other carrier, Frederick Moersch, a German immigrant who worked as a confectioner, was sent to North Brother Island in 1915, but he was allowed to leave in 1944 and was given a job at a Brooklyn hospital. He lived in Brooklyn, and his rent was paid for by the state. A second case involved Alphonse Cotils, a Belgian immigrant who owned a bakery in New York; his typhoid led to a ban from working in his bakery. In 1924, he was given a suspended sentence for breaching the ban; the judge stated that Cotils could not legally be imprisoned "on account of his health". Another asymptomatic carrier, Tony Labella, was responsible for eighty-seven cases of typhoid and two deaths; after he evaded the Department of Health's restrictions on his activities he caused an additional thirty-five cases and three deaths. Officials helped him find work unconnected with the food industry. By the time of Mallon's death, there were over four hundred recorded cases of asymptomatic typhoid carriers; none of them were detained or quarantined for as long as she was.

Much of the medical literature about Mallon contained value judgments about her. According to Leavitt, Mallon's status as a working-class immigrant appears to have shaped both public and scientific perceptions of her. Mallon's confinement on North Brother Island was affected by the recent campaign against tuberculosis, which was aimed at low-wage immigrants; Foss hypothesizes that had Mallon been born twenty years earlier or later, she would not have been imprisoned.

Cartoons featuring Mallon

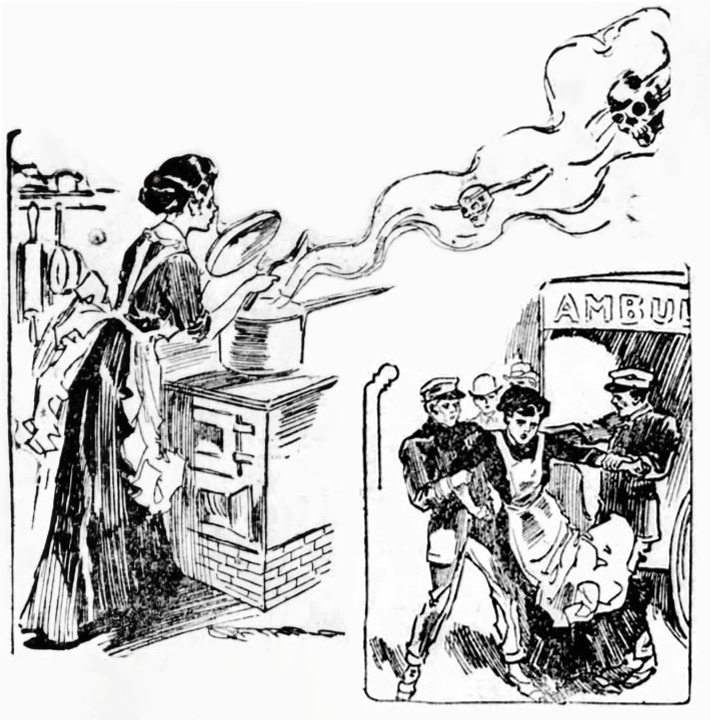
Mallon cooking and her arrest

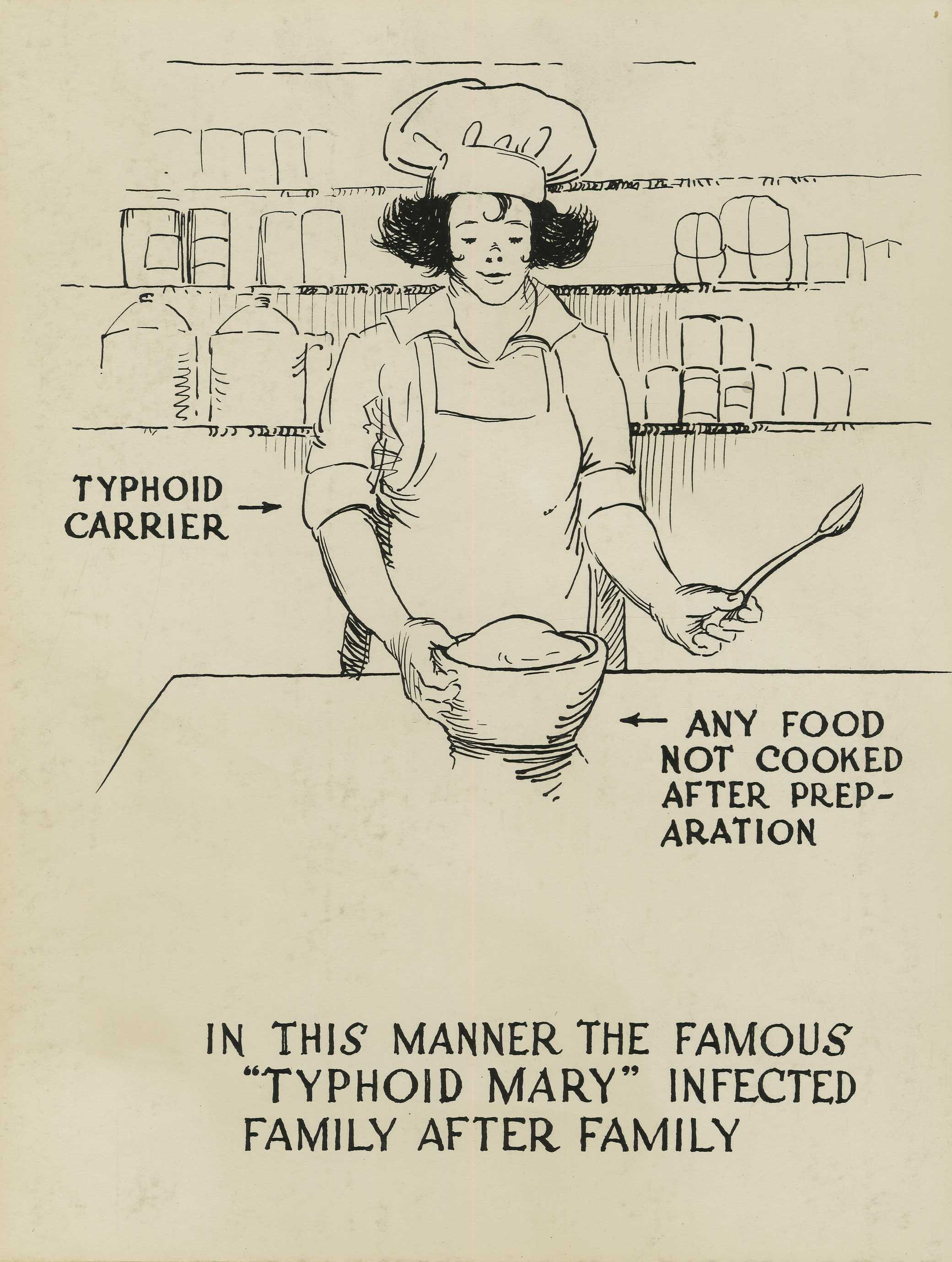
The dangers of a typhoid-carrying cook

In 1908, William Park, a bacteriologist with the New York City Department of Health, published a paper in JAMA which described Mallon's case. He stated: "The case of this woman brings up many interesting problems. Has the city a right to deprive her of her liberty for perhaps her whole life?" According to journalism historian Katherine A. Foss, Mallon's case "raise[s] legal questions about habeas corpus, civil liberties, and due process". Marineli et al argue that she was "a victim of the health laws, of the press and above all of the cynical physicians, who had plenty of time to test but never had time to talk with the patient". Mallon's case exemplifies the tension between the protection of individual liberty and the requirements of public health.

=== Historiography ===
According to Leavitt, while the early uses of her nickname were as "typhoid Mary"—using the disease as a descriptor—it soon changed to "Typhoid Mary", constructing a representation of Mallon as a diseased social pariah, rather than as a person. Wald describes the name "Typhoid Mary" as a "dehumanizing epithet". Early press coverage referred to Mallon as a bacterial agent, rather than a human being; terms included "a walking typhoid factory", "a human typhoid germ", "a living human culture tube", and "Woman 'typhoid factory'".

The reporting of Mallon's history has changed since her death. Between 1938 and the advent of HIV/AIDS in the 1980s, stories about Mallon focused on a human interest angle and, according to Leavitt, aimed to show how advances in medical science had improved modern life. After AIDS became a problem, writers took a more practical viewpoint, examining the risks an individual can pose to others and how to balance the rights of the individual with protecting public health. Marouf A. Hasian Jr., a professor of communications, observed: "the advent of HIV and the return of tuberculosis outbreaks has heralded a newfound respect for the trials and tribulations of Mary Mallon". When COVID-19 began spreading in 2019, several academics looked at Mallon's case in light of social-distancing measures. (Note: Their writings include: Bridges, Ben; Brillhart, Ross; Goldstein, Diane (2023). Behind the Mask: Vernacular Culture in the Time of COVID.; Darrow, Bill (2020). "Is History Repeating Itself? Lessons can be Learned from 'Typhoid Mary' in the Age of COVID-19".; Iredale, Dan (2020). "Asymptomatic Transmission and the Case of Typhoid Mary".; Schwarcz, Joe (2020). "Physical Isolation and the Case of Typhoid Mary".; Ironstone, Penelope (2020). "COVID-19: An Essay in Keywords".; Mohindra, Ritin, et al. (2021). "Superspreaders: A Lurking Danger in the Community".; Steere-Williams, Jacob (2020). "A 'Menace' or a Martyr to the Public's Health?".)

=== "Typhoid Mary" and public image ===
The phrase Typhoid Mary is now a colloquial term for anyone who spreads disease. It can also mean "A person who or thing which spreads or is the source of undesirable opinions, emotions, etc." Foss states that the name was so used as early as 1909, when The Washington Times used the name to describe a milk dealer; by mid-1910 the name was commonly applied to seemingly healthy individuals who passed disease to others.

Mallon has been fictionalized in several works, including Steve Beeferman's Typhoid Mary, Poz McBeefy, which is described by Foss as "a fictional story about HIV-positive heroes in the midst of a pandemic". There is also a one-woman play by Carolyn Gage about Mallon's life, Cookin' with Typhoid Mary, and Typhoid Mary: The Musical by Geoff Page. Mallon's nickname has been used for a supervillain in Marvel Comics. She first appeared in May 1988 as an enemy of Daredevil.

Several films and television series in twentieth and twenty-first century culture have used the name "Typhoid Mary" as a passing reference to illness or asymptomatic carriers. In these cases, "they further cement ... [Mallon's] place in popular culture as nothing more than a malicious distributor of disease", according to Foss. (Note: Foss lists such one-line references as appearing in series or films such as Star Trek, Grey's Anatomy, The Big Bang Theory, Quincy, M.E., Star Trek: Voyager; The X-Files, NCIS, Law & Order, Mission: Impossible 2, and Gilmore Girls.)

== Notes and references ==
=== Sources ===
==== Books ====
- Adler, Rich; Mara, Elise (2016). Typhoid Fever: A History. Jefferson, North Carolina: McFarland & Company. ISBN 978-0-7864-9781-2.
- Baker, Sara Josephine (1980). Fighting for Life. Huntington, New York: R. E. Krieger Pub. Co. ISBN 978-0-88275-611-0.
- Bridges, Ben; Brillhart, Ross; Goldstein, Diane (2023). Behind the Mask: Vernacular Culture in the Time of COVID. Logan, Utah: Utah State University Press. ISBN 978-1-64642-479-5.
- Foss, Katherine A. (2020). Constructing the Outbreak: Epidemics in Media & Collective Memory. Amherst, Massachusetts: University of Massachusetts Press. ISBN 978-1-62534-528-8.
- Hoppe, Trevor (2018). Punishing Disease: HIV and the Criminalization of Sickness. Oakland, California: University of California Press. ISBN 978-0-520-29158-4.
- Kraut, Alan M. (1994). Silent Travelers: Germs, Genes, and the "Immigrant Menace". New York: BasicBooks. ISBN 978-0-465-07823-3.
- Leavitt, Judith Walzer (1995). "Gendered Expectations: Women and Early Twentieth-Century Public Health". In Kerber, Linda K.; Kessler-Harris, Alice; Sklar, Kathryn Kish (eds.). U.S. History as Women's History: New Feminist Essays. Chapel Hill, North Carolina: University of North Carolina Press. pp. 147–169. ISBN 978-0-8078-2185-5.
- Leavitt, Judith Walzer (1996). Typhoid Mary: Captive to the Public's Health. Boston: Beacon Press. ISBN 978-0-8070-2102-6.
- Leavitt, Judith Walzer (1997). "'Typhoid Mary' Strikes Back: Bacteriological Theory and Practice in Early 20th-century Public Health". In Leavitt, Judith Walzer; Numbers, Ronald L. (eds.). Sickness and Health in America: Readings in the History of Medicine and Public Health. Madison, Wisconsin: University of Wisconsin Press. pp. 555–574. ISBN 978-0-299-15320-5.
- Miller, Chris H.; Palenik, Charles J. (1994). Infection Control. St. Louis, Missouri: Mosby. ISBN 978-0-8016-6932-3.
- Wald, Priscilla (2008). Contagious: Cultures, Carriers, and the Outbreak Narrative. Durham, North Carolina: Duke University Press. ISBN 978-0-8223-4128-4.
- Webber, Roger (2012). Communicable Diseases: A Global Perspective. Wallingford, Oxfordshire: CAB International. ISBN 978-1-84593-938-0.

==== Journals and magazines ====
- Adriani, Kirsten S. (September 20, 2019). "De Ongemakkelijke Geschiedenis van Mary Mallon en de Buiktyfus". Nederlands Tijdschrift voor Geneeskunde (in Dutch).
- Aronson, Stanley A. (May 1, 2020). "The Civil Rights of Mary Mallon" (PDF). Rhode Island Medical Journal. 103 (4): 74–75. PMID 32357597. Archived (PDF) from the original on January 15, 2026.
- Brooks, Janet (March 15, 1996). "The Sad and Tragic Life of Typhoid Mary". Canadian Medical Association Journal. 154 (6): 915–916. PMC 1487781. PMID 8634973.
- Gibbins, L. N. (June 1998). "Mary Mallon: Disease, Denial, and Detention". Journal of Biological Education. 32 (2): 127–132. doi:10.1080/00219266.1998.9655608.
- Hasian Jr, Marouf A. (Fall 2000). "Power, Medical Knowledge, and the Rhetorical Investion of 'Typhoid Mary'". Journal of Medical Humanities. 21 (3): 123–139. doi:10.1023/A:1009074619421. PMID 11658113.
- Hoffman, Seth A.; Sikorski, Michael J.; Levine, Myron M. (March 23, 2023). "Chronic Salmonella Typhi Carriage at Sites Other than the Gallbladder". PLOS Neglected Tropical Diseases. 17 (3) e0011168. doi:10.1371/journal.pntd.0011168. PMC 10035749. PMID 36952437.
- Ironstone, Penelope (2020). "COVID-19: An Essay in Keywords". TOPIA: Canadian Journal of Cultural Studies. 41 (1): 13–21. doi:10.3138/topia-003.
- Korr, Mary (May 1, 2020). "Mary Mallon: First Asymptomatic Carrier of Typhoid Fever" (PDF). Rhode Island Medical Journal. 103 (4): 73. Archived (PDF) from the original on August 4, 2026.
- Marineli, Filio; Tsoucalas, Gregory; Karamanou, Marianna; Androutsos, George (2013). "Mary Mallon (1869–1938) and the History of Typhoid Fever". Annals of Gastroenterology. 26 (2): 132–134. PMC 3959940. PMID 24714738.
- "Mary Mallon". American Journal of Public Health and the Nation's Health. 29 (1): 66–68. January 1939. doi:10.2105/ajph.29.1.66. PMC 1529062. PMID 18014976.
- Mohindra, Ritin; Ghai, Arushi; Brar, Rinnie; Khandelwal, Neha; Biswal, Manisha; Suri, Vikas; Goyal, Kapil; Singh, Mini P.; Bhalla, Ashish; Rana, Kirtan; Lakshmi, P. V. M. (January 2021). "Superspreaders: A Lurking Danger in the Community". Journal of Primary Care & Community Health. 12 2150132720987432. doi:10.1177/2150132720987432. PMC 7812391. PMID 33448254.
- Park, William H. (September 19, 1908). "Typhoid Bacilli Carriers". Journal of the American Medical Association. LI (12): 981–982. doi:10.1001/jama.1908.25410120025002e.
- Prescott, Peter S. (February 20, 1984). "A Fatal Cook's Tour". Newsweek. Vol. 103, no. 8.
- Soper, George (June 15, 1907). "The Work of a Chronic Typhoid Germ Distributor". JAMA: The Journal of the American Medical Association. XLVIII (24): 2019–2022. doi:10.1001/jama.1907.25220500025002d.
- Soper, George (October 1939). "The Curious Career of Typhoid Mary". Bulletin of the New York Academy of Medicine. 15 (10): 698–712. PMC 1911442. PMID 19312127.
- Steere-Williams, Jacob (December 2, 2020). "A 'Menace' or a Martyr to the Public's Health?". Isis. 111 (4): 818–821. doi:10.1086/712254. ISSN 0021-1753.
- Wald, Priscilla (1997). "Cultures and Carriers: "Typhoid Mary" and the Science of Social Control". Social Text (52/53): 181–214. doi:10.2307/466739. ISSN 0164-2472. JSTOR 466739.
- Winderman, Emily; Mejia, Robert; Rogers, Brandon (July 16, 2019). "'All Smell Is Disease': Miasma, Sensory Rhetoric, and the Sanitary-Bacteriologic of Visceral Public Health". Rhetoric of Health & Medicine. 2 (2): 115–146. doi:10.5744/rhm.2019.1006.

==== News ====
- "Typhoid Mary Buried". The New York Times. November 13, 1938. p. 30.
- "'Typhoid Mary' Dies of a Stroke at 68". The New York Times. November 12, 1938. p. 17. Archived from the original on April 21, 2020.
- "'Typhoid Mary' Freed". The New York Times. February 21, 1910. p. 18. Archived from the original on July 8, 2020.
- "'Typhoid Mary' Never Ill, Begs Freedom". New York American. June 30, 1909. p. 3.

==== Websites ====
- "Consumer Price Index, 1800–". Federal Reserve Bank of Minneapolis. Archived from the original on June 19, 2020.
- Darrow, Bill (April 27, 2020). "Is History Repeating Itself? Lessons can be Learned from 'Typhoid Mary' in the Age of COVID-19". Florida International University. Archived from the original on August 4, 2026.
- Faherty, Anna (June 29, 2017). "The Cook who Became a Pariah". Wellcome Collection. Archived from the original on January 5, 2026.
- Iredale, Dan (June 24, 2020). "Asymptomatic Transmission and the Case of Typhoid Mary". University of Cambridge. Archived from the original on August 4, 2026.
- Leavitt, Judith Walzer (February 2000). "Mallon, Mary (1869–1938), Domestic Cook and First Identified Healthy Carrier of Typhoid Fever in North America". American National Biography. doi:10.1093/anb/9780198606697.article.1202080. Archived from the original on June 4, 2024.
- Schwarcz, Joe (May 15, 2020). "Physical Isolation and the Case of Typhoid Mary". McGill University. Archived from the original on August 4, 2026.
- "Typhoid Mary". Oxford English Dictionary (online ed.). Oxford University Press. (Subscription or participating institution membership required.)
- Wawrzynczak, Edward (January 12, 2019). "Caricature, Contestation and the Making of 'Typhoid Mary'". British Society for the History of Medicine. Archived from the original on October 6, 2025.
