= Royal Alexander Brink =

Canadian-American plant geneticist (1897–1984)

- Born: September 16, 1897; Woodstock, Ontario, Canada
- Died: October 2, 1984 (aged 87); Madison, Wisconsin, U.S.
- Other name: R. A. Brink
- Education: Ontario Agricultural College; University of Illinois Urbana–Champaign; Harvard University (DSc)
- Known for: Paramutation in maize; maize genetics; crop improvement
- Awards: National Academy of Sciences (1947); American Academy of Arts and Sciences (1960)
- Scientific career
- Fields: Plant genetics, plant breeding
- Workplaces: University of Wisconsin–Madison
- Doctoral advisor: Edward Murray East
- Notable students: Esther Lederberg

Royal Alexander Brink (16 September 1897 – 2 October 1984), also known as R. A. Brink, was a Canadian-born American plant geneticist and plant breeder at the University of Wisconsin–Madison. He is best known for discovering paramutation in maize, a phenomenon in which one allele induces a heritable change in another without altering DNA sequence.

== Career and research ==
Brink joined the faculty of the University of Wisconsin in 1922 and played a central role in establishing its maize genetics and breeding programs. He initiated hybrid corn breeding efforts in Wisconsin and contributed to the development of improved forage crops, including winter-hardy alfalfa (Vernal) and nonbitter sweet clover varieties.

His early research included studies of gene expression in pollen, semi-sterility associated with chromosomal rearrangements, and linkage mapping in maize. He and D. C. Cooper demonstrated the importance of the endosperm in seed development and failure in interspecific crosses.

Brink later made major contributions to the study of genetic instability and transposable elements, showing that the unstable P-w allele in maize resulted from the insertion of a mobile genetic element (Modulator, Mp) and that it was functionally equivalent to the Activator (Ac) element described by Barbara McClintock.

His most influential work was the discovery of paramutation at the r locus in maize, first reported in 1956 and later elaborated in molecular and genetic detail. He demonstrated that interactions between alleles could lead to heritable changes in gene expression without changes in DNA sequence. This phenomenon has had lasting significance for epigenetics and gene regulation.

== Professional service ==
Brink served as chair of the Department of Genetics at the University of Wisconsin–Madison from 1939 to 1951 and was influential in establishing it as a leading center for genetics research. He also served as president of the Genetics Society of America in 1957 and as managing editor of the journal Genetics from 1952 to 1957.

Brink played a role in recruiting Joshua Lederberg to the University of Wisconsin in 1947 as part of efforts to expand genetics into microorganisms.

== Honors and legacy ==
Brink was elected to the National Academy of Sciences in 1947 and to the American Academy of Arts and Sciences in 1960. He received numerous honors for his contributions to genetics and agriculture and trained more than fifty doctoral students, including Esther Lederberg.
