= Melvin Morse =

Melvin Morse may refer to:

- Melvin L. Morse, pediatrician and author on near death experiences
- M. Laurance Morse (1921–2003), American microbiologist
