= Replica plating =

Microbiological technique

Like a "printing press" for bacteria, a master agar plate is used to transfer colonies onto velvet, which is then used to stamp the same pattern of colonies onto replica agar plates, maintaining their relative positions.

Negative selection through replica plating to screen for ampicillin sensitive colonies

Replica plating is a microbiological technique in which one or more secondary Petri plates containing different solid (agar-based) selective growth media (lacking nutrients or containing chemical growth inhibitors such as antibiotics) are inoculated with the same colonies of microorganisms from a primary plate (or master dish), reproducing the original spatial pattern of colonies. The technique involves pressing a velveteen-covered disk, and then imprinting secondary plates with cells in colonies removed from the original plate by the material. Generally, large numbers of colonies (roughly 30-300) are replica plated due to the difficulty in streaking each out individually onto a separate plate.

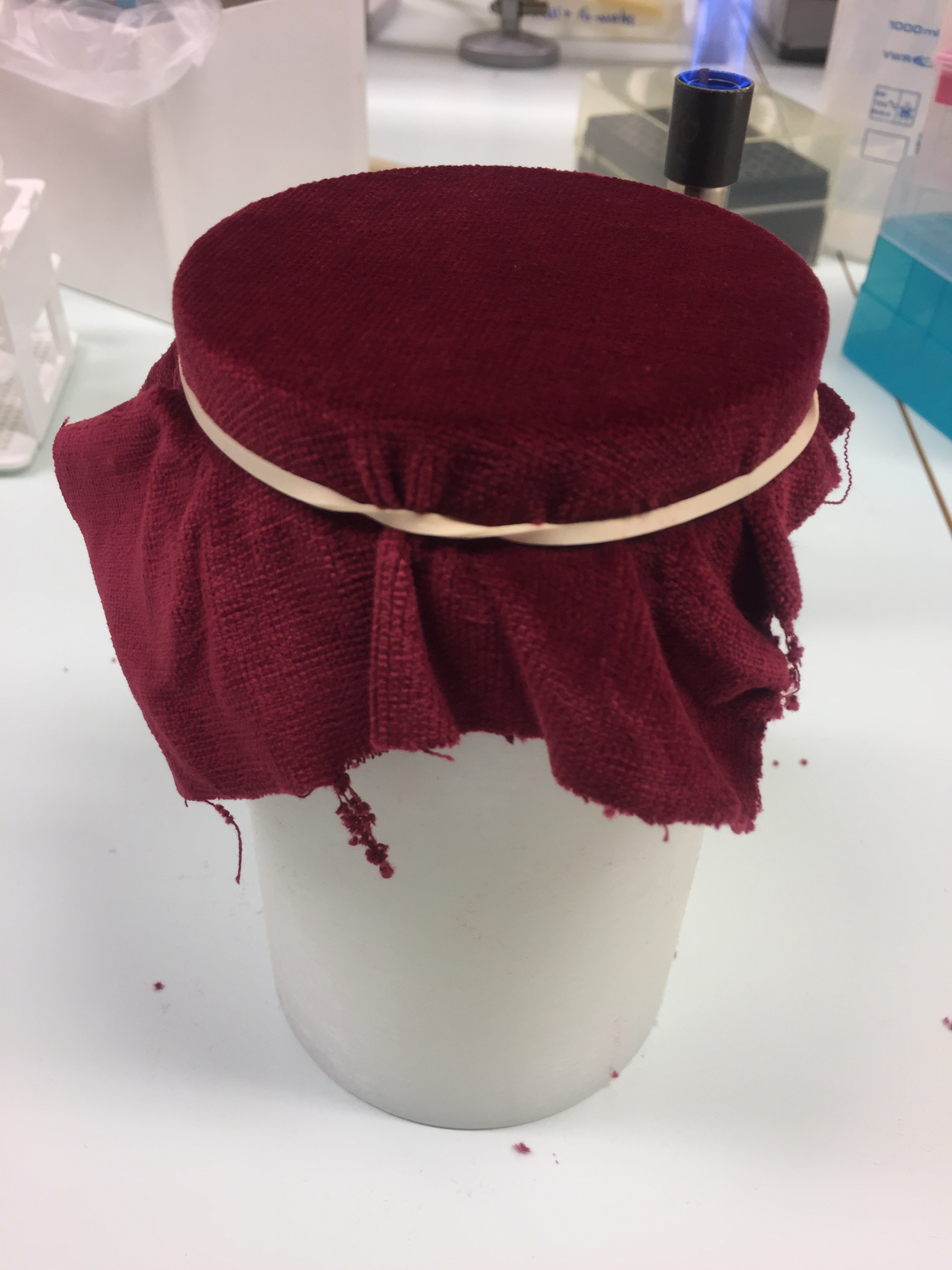
A sterile velvet on a plastic block for replica plating

The purpose of replica plating is to be able to compare the master plate and any secondary plates, typically to screen for a desired phenotype. For example, when a colony that was present on the primary plate (or master dish), fails to appear on a secondary plate, it shows that the colony was sensitive to a substance on that particular secondary plate. Common screenable phenotypes include auxotrophy and antibiotic resistance.

Replica plating is especially useful for "negative selection". However, it is more correct to refer to "negative screening" instead of using the term 'selection'. For example, if one wanted to select colonies that were sensitive to ampicillin, the primary plate could be replica plated on a secondary Amp^{+} agar plate. The sensitive colonies on the secondary plate would die but the colonies could still be deduced from the primary plate since the two have the same spatial patterns from ampicillin resistant colonies. The sensitive colonies could then be picked off from the primary plate. Frequently the last plate will be non-selective. In the figure, a nonselective plate will be replica plated after the Amp+ plate to confirm that the absence of growth on the selective plate is due to the selection itself and not a problem with transferring cells. If one sees growth on the third (nonselective) plate but not the second one, the selective agent is responsible for the lack of growth. If the non-selective plate shows no growth, one cannot say whether viable cells were transferred at all, and no conclusions can be made about the presence or absence of growth on selective media. This is particularly useful if there are questions about the age or viability of the cells on the original plate.

By increasing the variety of secondary plates with different selective growth media, it is possible to rapidly screen a large number of individual isolated colonies for as many phenotypes as there are secondary plates.

The development of replica plating required two steps. The first step was to define the problem: a method of identifiably duplicating colonies. The second step was to devise a means to reliably implement the first step. Replica plating was first described by Esther Lederberg and Joshua Lederberg in 1952. One of the nutrient agar plate will have antibiotic resistance. Lederberg sought to use a fabric that was able to be sterilized, and had a vertical fabric pile, akin to a 2D analog "wire brush" of that had been classically used to transfer colonies. Paper was unsatisfactory as "its lateral capillarity and its compression of the colonies distorted and broke up the original growth pattern.", and nylon velvet was too expensive and its stiffer fibers caused problems, leading to the choice and eventual standardization on cotton velveteen. While first demonstrated with bacteria, velveteen based replica plating has also become a standard technique in the microbiology of eukaryotes, such as yeast.
