= Harry Stone (scholar) =

American scholar and educator (1926–2021)

- Born: February 1, 1926; Mount Vernon, New York, U.S.
- Died: December 17, 2021 (aged 95); Los Angeles, California, U.S.
- Education: UCLA (BA, MA, PhD)
- Occupations: Literary scholar, professor
- Employer(s): California State University, Northridge
- Known for: Charles Dickens scholarship; Harry Stone Dickens Collection
- Notable work: The Night Side of Dickens: Cannibalism, Passion, Necessity
- Awards: Guggenheim Fellowship; National Endowment for the Humanities fellowship

Harry Stone (February 1, 1926 – December 17, 2021) was an American literary scholar and professor of English at California State University, Northridge. He specialized in Charles Dickens, taught Victorian literature at CSUN for more than three decades, and assembled a large collection of Dickens-related books, manuscripts, and memorabilia that he later donated to the university.

== Early life and education ==
Stone was born on February 1, 1926, in Mount Vernon, New York, to Bernard and Annie (Rappaport) Stone, both of whom were born in England to Jewish families that fled persecution in Eastern Europe. His family moved to Los Angeles in 1938. Stone attended John Burroughs Junior High School and Fairfax High School before enrolling at the University of California, Los Angeles (UCLA), where he earned a bachelor’s degree in 1946 in physics, naval science, and political science. During World War II he served in the United States Navy. He later completed a master’s degree in English literature in 1950 from UCLA as well as a doctoral degree in 1955 with a two-volume dissertation on Dickens’s reading.

== Academic career ==
Stone began his teaching career at Northwestern University in 1955 before joining the faculty of California State University, Northridge (then San Fernando Valley State College) in 1960. Over a 32-year career at CSUN, he taught courses on Victorian literature with a particular focus on Charles Dickens. He retired from teaching in 1992. During his academic career, Stone was awarded a Guggenheim Fellowship, a National Endowment for the Humanities fellowship, and other grants, which enabled him to conduct research abroad. In addition, in 1981 Stone was awarded the American Council of Learned Societies national award, and he was also president of the Dickens Society in 1971 and 1998. He published nine books and contributed to other books, scholarly articles, and essays on Dickens.

== Dickens collection and scholarship ==
Stone began reading Dickens' complete works as a teenager. Over his lifetime he assembled the Harry Stone Dickens Collection, a comprehensive archive of Dickens-related materials and memorabilia that spans items dating from 1400 to 2018. The collection includes first editions of Dickens’s novels in both serialized and bound form, personal letters, corrected proof sheets, translations, photographs, paintings, toys and figurines inspired by Dickens characters, and other Dickensiana.

In 2003, Stone announced his intention to donate the collection to CSUN’s University Library, where it is now preserved for research and educational use.

Stone’s scholarship examined less familiar and darker aspects of Dickens’s writing. In 1988, he identified an 1857 story as a previously unrecognized work by Dickens.

== Personal life and death ==
Stone married Esther Brucker in 1951, and together they had two children. Esther died in 1970. Harry Stone died on December 17, 2021, at the age of 95.

== Selected works ==
- Dickens, Charles (1969). Stone, Harry (ed.). The Uncollected Writings of Charles Dickens: Household Words, 1850–1859. London: Allen Lane.
- Stone, Harry (1979). Dickens and the Invisible World: Fairy Tales, Fantasy, and Novel-Making. Bloomington: Indiana University Press.
- Dickens, Charles (1984). Harry Stone (ed.). George Silverman’s Explanation. Santa Susana Press.
- Stone, Harry, ed. (1987). Dickens’ Working Notes for His Novels. Chicago: University of Chicago Press.
- Stone, Harry (1994). The Night Side of Dickens: Cannibalism, Passion, Necessity. Columbus: Ohio State University Press.
- Dickens, Charles (1996). Stone, Harry (ed.). The Bride’s Chamber. Waxwing Editions.
