= George Soper =

American engineer and epidemiologist

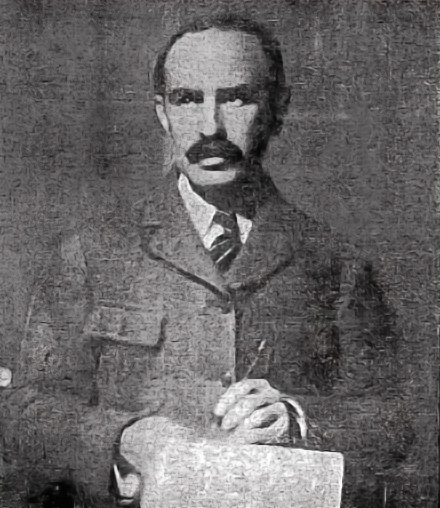
Soper, c. 1915

George Albert Soper II (2 February 1870 – 17 June 1948) was an American sanitation engineer and epidemiologist. He specialized in the investigation of water- and food-borne disease and urban sanitation, and is best known for identifying Mary Mallon (Typhoid Mary) as the first recognized asymptomatic carrier of typhoid fever in the United States.

Over a career that ranged from the Galveston hurricane of 1900 to the 1918–1919 influenza pandemic and early national cancer campaigns, Soper held senior positions in municipal and military public health, served as managing director of the American Society for the Control of Cancer (later the American Cancer Society), and wrote influential articles on epidemic control and waste disposal.

== Biography ==
=== Early life and education ===
Soper was born in Brooklyn in 1870, the son of George Albert Soper (1837–1869) and Georgianna Lydia Buckman (died 1882). He received a B.S. degree in civil engineering from Rensselaer Polytechnic Institute in 1895 and later earned an A.M. (1898) and Ph.D. (1899) from Columbia University.

After graduation he worked as a civil engineer for the Boston Water Works and for the Cumberland Manufacturing Company, which built filtration equipment, gaining experience in water purification and sanitary engineering.

=== Early sanitary engineering work ===
In 1900 Soper was sent to Galveston, Texas, after the hurricane that devastated the city, as engineer in charge of sanitary reconstruction. His work there brought him to wider attention and, in 1902, he was appointed sanitary engineer to the New York City Department of Health.

He soon became known as an expert in controlling typhoid fever outbreaks using what would now be called epidemiological methods. In 1904 he was asked by New York State authorities to direct efforts to suppress a serious typhoid epidemic in Ithaca, and his success there led to further consulting work for other cities.

Soper later studied the ventilation of the New York City subway system for the Transit Commission, conducting thousands of air analyses and recommending improvements, and served on commissions dealing with sewage disposal and water supply in New York and Chicago.

=== Typhoid Mary investigation ===
Soper’s most famous investigation involved the cook Mary Mallon, later nicknamed "Typhoid Mary." In 1906 he was hired to determine the source of typhoid cases in a household in Oyster Bay, Long Island. After ruling out water, milk, and plumbing as sources of infection, he noticed that a cook, Mary Mallon, had recently been employed there.

By tracing Mallon’s employment history through employment agencies over roughly a decade, Soper found that typhoid outbreaks had occurred in most of the households where she had worked, even though she herself appeared healthy. His 1907 paper, "The Work of a Chronic Typhoid Germ Distributor," presented to the Biological Society of Washington, set out the evidence that Mallon was an asymptomatic carrier and helped establish the importance of healthy carriers in the transmission of infectious disease.

Mallon was ultimately located and physically detained by the New York City Department of Health. Soper later revisited the episode in his article "The Curious Career of Typhoid Mary," published in 1939 in the Bulletin of the New York Academy of Medicine, which has become a standard historical account of the case.

=== Military service and influenza pandemic ===
During World War I, Soper served as an officer in the Sanitary Corps of the United States Army, attaining the rank of major. In this role he studied the spread of influenza in American military camps.

In November 1918 he published "The Influenza Pneumonia Pandemic in the American Army Camps during September and October, 1918" in Science, providing one of the earliest quantitative overviews of the epidemic among U.S. troops. The following year he published "The Lessons of the Pandemic," also in Science, in which he reflected on the failure of existing public health methods to control influenza and advocated measures such as avoiding crowds and reducing opportunities for respiratory transmission. These articles have continued to be cited in later historical and epidemiological work on the 1918–1919 pandemic.

=== Cancer control and later public health work ===
In 1923 Soper was appointed managing director of the American Society for the Control of Cancer, the organization that later became the American Cancer Society, a post he held until 1928 before continuing as a consultant. He helped organize national conferences and public education campaigns on cancer, including work associated with the opening of new state cancer hospitals in the 1920s.

In the 1930s Soper worked with the New York Academy of Medicine’s Committee of Twenty on Street and Outdoor Cleanliness. He was sent on an extended tour of European cities to study street cleaning, refuse collection, incineration, and snow removal. His reports, including Further Studies of European Methods of Street Cleaning and Refuse Disposal, with Suggestions for New York (1930), argued that New York’s refuse system lagged behind contemporary European practice and called for covered collection wagons and modern incinerators. His ideas influenced changes in the city’s sanitation infrastructure in the 1930s, including the adoption of enclosed sanitation trucks and the gradual move away from dumping garbage at sea.

=== Personal life and death ===
Soper was married twice, first to Mary Virginia McLeod and later to Eloise Liddon, and had two sons. In his later years he lived with family in Hampton Bays, Long Island. He died on 17 June 1948 at Southampton Hospital, New York, aged 78.

Soper is buried at Green-Wood Cemetery in Brooklyn. The cemetery describes him as a "sanitation engineer and epidemiologist" whose work on typhoid, influenza, and urban refuse "saved countless lives."

== Selected works ==
- Soper, George A. "The Work of a Chronic Typhoid Germ Distributor." Paper read before the Biological Society of Washington, 6 April 1907.
- Soper, George A. "Typhoid Mary." The Military Surgeon 45 (1919): 1–13.
- Soper, George A. "The Influenza Pneumonia Pandemic in the American Army Camps during September and October, 1918." Science 48, no. 1245 (1918): 451–456.
- Soper, George A. "The Lessons of the Pandemic." Science 49, no. 1274 (1919): 501–506.
- Soper, George A. "National Aspects of the Cancer Problem." Boston Medical and Surgical Journal 197, no. 14 (1927): 554–556.

== See also ==
- Typhoid Mary
- Mary Mallon
- Sara Josephine Baker
- Asymptomatic carrier
- Sanitary engineering
- Public health
- 1918 influenza pandemic

== Notes ==
- "Dr. G. A. Soper dies; fought epidemics". The New York Times. 18 June 1948. p. 23.

== Sources ==
- Leavitt, Judith Walzer (1996). Typhoid Mary: Captive to the Public's Health. Boston: Beacon Press. ISBN 9780807095591.
