= Francis J. Ryan =

American zoologist

- Born: Francis Joseph Ryan; February 1, 1916; Brooklyn, New York, U.S.
- Died: July 14, 1963 (aged 47); Manhattan, New York, U.S.
- Education: Columbia University
- Awards: Guggenheim Fellowship (1950)
- Scientific career
- Fields: Genetics
- Workplaces: Columbia University
- Notable students: Joshua Lederberg

Francis Joseph Ryan (February 1, 1916 – July 14, 1963) was an American zoologist. He was professor and chair of Columbia University's department of zoology.

== Biography ==
Ryan was born on February 1, 1916, in Brooklyn, New York. He received his B.A. from Columbia University in 1937 and his Ph.D. in 1941. He then joined the faculty and eventually became assistant professor, associate professor, full professor and department head. He was a mentor of future Nobel Prize winner Joshua Lederberg, who credited Ryan for "taking a callow underclassman from Washington Heights, brash and argumentative as precocious students often are, and turned [him] into a scientist."

Ryan's research focused on a variety of fields, including experimental embryology, microbial genetics, and he did research on escherichia coli to understand how information about an organism is imprinted in its genetic structure. His work during the 1950s also disproved the theories of Trofim Lysenko that evolutionary changes are initiated by the environment.

Ryan received a Guggenheim Fellowship in 1950. He was also a Fulbright Professor at the University of Tokyo in 1955–1956, during which he also served as a consultant to Japanese microbiologists in industry and universities. He held visiting professorships and fellowships at the Pasteur Institute and the Hebrew University of Jerusalem.

Ryan was elected a member of the American Academy of Arts and Sciences in 1960. He was also a trustee of the Cold Spring Harbor Laboratory.

Ryan died of a heart attack on July 14, 1963, at 47 years old.
