= M. Laurance Morse =

American geneticist

Melvin Laurance Morse
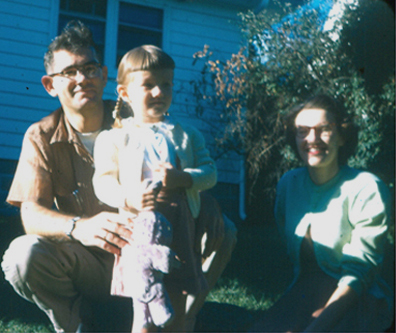
- Larry Morse with wife Helvise and daughter Margaret, Tower Hill, WI, 1953
- Born: February 23, 1921; Hopkinton, Massachusetts
- Died: November 7, 2003 (aged 82)
- Education: University of New Hampshire; University of Kentucky; University of Wisconsin
- Known for: Specialized Transduction
- Scientific career
- Fields: Microbiology; Microbial Genetics
- Workplaces: Oak Ridge National Laboratory; University of Wisconsin-Madison; University of Colorado School of Medicine
- Doctoral advisor: Joshua Lederberg

Melvin Laurance Morse (February 23, 1921 – November 7, 2003) was an American microbiologist. He is notable for his experiments (with Esther Lederberg and Joshua Lederberg) in specialized transduction.

== Professional associations ==
- American Society for Microbiology
- American Association for the Advancement of Science
