= Esther Lederberg =

American microbiologist (1922–2006)

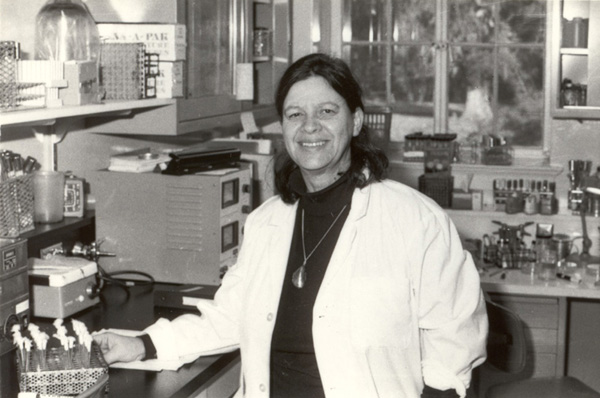
- Stanford University laboratory
- Born: Esther Miriam Zimmer; December 18, 1922; Bronx, New York, U.S.
- Died: November 11, 2006 (aged 83); Stanford, California, U.S.
- Education: Hunter College, Stanford University, University of Wisconsin
- Known for: Lambda phage, specialized transduction, replica plating, fertility factor F, Plasmid Reference Center
- Spouses: Joshua Lederberg (m. 1945; div. 1968); Matthew Simon (m. 1993)
- Awards: Pasteur Award
- Scientific career
- Fields: Microbiology; Microbial Genetics
- Workplaces: Stanford University; University of Wisconsin
- Doctoral advisor: R. A. Brink

Esther Miriam Zimmer Lederberg (December 18, 1922 – November 11, 2006) was an American microbiologist and a pioneer of bacterial genetics. She discovered the bacterial virus lambda phage and the bacterial fertility factor F, devised the first implementation of replica plating, and furthered the understanding of the transfer of genes between bacteria by specialized transduction.

Lederberg also founded and directed the now-defunct Plasmid Reference Center at Stanford University, where she maintained, named, and distributed plasmids of many types, including those coding for antibiotic resistance, heavy metal resistance, virulence, conjugation, colicins, transposons, and other unknown factors.

As a woman in a male-dominated field and the wife of Nobel laureate Joshua Lederberg, Esther Lederberg struggled for professional recognition. Despite her foundational discoveries in the field of microbiology, she was never offered a tenured position at a university. Textbooks often ignore her work and attribute her accomplishments to her husband.

== Early years ==
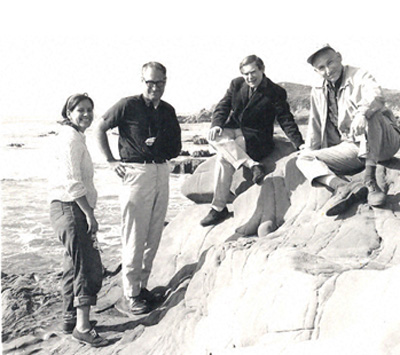
Esther Lederberg, Gunther Stent, S. Brenner, J. Lederberg, 1965

Esther Miriam Zimmer was the first of two children born in the Bronx, New York, to a family of Orthodox Jewish background. Her parents were David Zimmer, an immigrant from Romania who ran a print shop, and Pauline Geller Zimmer. Her brother, Benjamin Zimmer, followed in 1923. Zimmer was a child of the Great Depression, and her lunch was often a piece of bread topped by the juice of a squeezed tomato. Zimmer learned Hebrew and she used this proficiency to conduct Passover seders.

Zimmer attended Evander Childs High School in the Bronx, graduating in 1938 at the age of 15. She was awarded a scholarship to attend New York City's Hunter College starting that fall. In college, Zimmer initially wanted to study French or literature, but she switched her field of study to biochemistry against the recommendation of her teachers, who felt that a woman would have more difficulty pursuing a career in the sciences. She worked as a research assistant at the New York Botanical Garden, engaging in research on Neurospora crassa with the plant pathologist Bernard Ogilvie Dodge. She received a bachelor's degree in genetics, graduating cum laude in 1942, at the age of 19.

After her graduation from Hunter, Zimmer went to work as a research assistant to Alexander Hollaender at the Carnegie Institution of Washington (later Cold Spring Harbor Laboratory), where she continued to work with N. crassa and published her first work in genetics. In 1944 she won a fellowship to Stanford University, working as an assistant to George Wells Beadle and Edward Tatum. When she asked Tatum to teach her genetics, he initially demurred until he made her determine why, in a bottle of Drosophila fruit flies, one fly had different colored eyes than the others. This she worked out so successfully that Tatum made her his TA. She later traveled west to California, and after a summer studying at Stanford University's Hopkins Marine Station under Cornelius Van Niel, she entered a master's program in genetics. Stanford awarded her a master's degree in 1946. Her M.A. thesis was entitled "Mutant Strains of Neurospora Deficient in Para-Aminobenzoic Acid". That same year, she married Joshua Lederberg, then a student of Tatum's at Yale University. Lederberg moved to Yale's Osborn Botanical Laboratory and then to the University of Wisconsin after her husband became a professor there. There she pursued a doctorate degree. From 1946 to 1949, she was awarded a predoctoral fellowship by the National Cancer Institute. Her thesis was "Genetic control of mutability in the bacterium Escherichia coli." She completed her doctorate under the supervision of R. A. Brink in 1950.

== Contributions to microbiology and genetics ==
Lederberg remained at the University of Wisconsin for most of the 1950s. It was there that she discovered lambda phage, did early research on the relationship between transduction and lambda phage lysogeny, discovered the E. coli F fertility factor with Luigi Luca Cavalli-Sforza (eventually publishing with Joshua Lederberg), devised the first successful implementation of replica plating with Joshua Lederberg, and helped discover and understand the genetic mechanisms of specialized transduction. These contributions laid the foundation for much of the genetics work done in the latter half of the twentieth century. Because of her work, she is considered to be a pioneer in bacterial genetics. In 1956, Esther and Joshua Lederberg were honored for their fundamental studies of bacterial genetics by the Society of Illinois Bacteriologists, which awarded them the Pasteur Medal.

=== λ bacteriophage ===
Esther Lederberg was the first to isolate λ bacteriophage. She initially reported the discovery in 1951 while she was a PhD student and later provided a detailed description in a 1953 paper in the journal Genetics. She was working with an E. coli K12 strain that had been mutagenized with ultraviolet light. When she incubated a mixture of the mutant strain with its parent E. coli K12 strain on an agar plate, she saw plaques, which were known to be caused by bacteriophages. The source of the bacteriophage was the parental K12 strain. The UV treatment had "cured" the bacteriophage from the mutant, making it sensitive to infection by the same bacteriophage that the parent produced. The bacteriophage was named λ. Her studies showed that λ had both a typical lifestyle in which the phage rapidly made many copies of itself before bursting out of the E. coli host and an alternative lifestyle in which the phage existed quietly within E. coli as just another genetic marker.

Esther and Joshua Lederberg demonstrated that λ, in its quiescent form, genetically mapped near the E. coli genes required for metabolism of the sugar galactose (gal). The Lederbergs proposed that the genetic material of λ physically integrated into the chromosome next to the gal genes and subsequently replicated as a prophage along with the DNA of the host bacterium. When the prophage is later prompted to leave the host, it must excise itself from the host DNA. Occasionally, the phage DNA that is excised is accompanied by adjacent host DNA, which can be introduced into a new host by the phage. This process is called specialized transduction.

Following publication of her studies on λ over several years, Lederberg presented her findings at international conferences. In 1957, Lederberg gave a talk on λ lysogeny and specialized transduction at the Symposium of Bacterial and Viral Genetics in Canberra, Australia. In 1958, she presented her findings on the fine-structure mapping of the gal locus at the 10th International Congress of Genetics in Montreal, Canada.

=== Bacterial fertility factor F ===
Lederberg's discovery of the fertility factor (F factor) stemmed directly from her experiments to map the location of lambda prophage on the E. coli chromosome by crosses with other E. coli strains with known genetic markers. When some of the crosses failed to give rise to recombinants, she suspected that some of her E. coli strains had lost a "fertility factor." In her own words:

In terms of testing available markers ... the data showed that there was a specific locus for lysogenicity. ... In the course of such linkage [genetic mapping] studies,...one day, ZERO recombinants were recovered....I explored the notion that there was some sort of 'fertility factor' which if absent, resulted in no recombinants. For short, I named this F.

Later work by others showed that the F factor is a bacterial DNA sequence harboring genes that allow a bacterium to donate DNA to a recipient bacterium by direct contact in a process called conjugation. The DNA sequence encoding the F factor can exist either as an independent plasmid or integrate into the bacterial cell's chromosome.

=== Origin of mutations ===
The problem of reproducing bacterial colonies en masse in the same geometric configuration as on original agar plate was first successfully solved by replica plating, as implemented by Esther and Joshua Lederberg. Scientists had been struggling for a reliable solution for at least a decade before the Lederbergs implemented it successfully. Less efficient forerunners to the methodology were toothpicks, paper, wire brushes, and multipronged inoculators. Biographer Rebecca Ferrell believes that the method Lederberg invented was likely inspired by using her father's press at his work, pressing a plate of bacterial colonies onto sterile velvet, after which they were stamped onto plates of media with different ingredients, depending on the desired traits the researcher wished to observe.

The Lederbergs used the replica-plating method to demonstrate that bacteriophage- and antibiotic-resistance mutants arose in the absence of phages or antibiotics. The spontaneous nature of mutations was previously demonstrated by Luria and Delbrück. However, many scientists failed to grasp the mathematical arguments of Luria and Delbrück's findings, and their paper was either ignored or rejected by other scientists. The controversy was settled by the Lederbergs' simple replica-plating experiment.

=== Plasmid Reference Center ===
Esther Lederberg returned to Stanford in 1959 with Joshua Lederberg. She remained at Stanford for the balance of her research career, directing the Plasmid Reference Center (PRC) at the Stanford School of Medicine from 1976 to 1986. As director of the PRC, she organized and maintained a registry of the world's plasmids, transposons, and insertion sequences. She initiated the system of naming insertion sequences and transposons sequentially beginning with IS1 and Tn1. The sequential numbering continued until her retirement.

She retired from her position in the Stanford Department of Microbiology and Immunology in 1985, but continued her work at the PRC as a volunteer.

== Professional challenges: gender discrimination ==
Microbiologist Stanley Falkow said of Esther Lederberg that "[e]xperimentally and methodologically she was a genius in the lab." However, although Esther Lederberg was a pioneer research scientist, she faced significant challenges as a woman scientist in the 1950s and 1960s.

After her foundational discoveries of the F factor and λ in graduate school, Joshua Lederberg stopped her from conducting additional experiments to follow up on her discoveries. According to Esther, Joshua, as her thesis advisor, wanted her to finish her PhD dissertation. Her graduate school advisor, R.A. Brink, may not have recognized the significance of her discoveries. She may have been fully recognized for her discoveries if she were allowed to pursue them immediately. Instead, the delay hurt her legacy as an independent research scientist, and her findings on bacterial sex are now credited primarily to her husband. In fact, most textbooks highlight Joshua Lederberg's role in the discoveries made jointly with Esther. The lack of credit Esther Lederberg is given for development of the replica plating technique has been cited as an example of the Matilda effect, in which discoveries made by women scientists are unfairly attributed to their male colleagues. By the time Joshua won the Nobel Prize in 1958, the research centers that were recruiting him saw Esther as his wife and research assistant rather than an independent scientist.

Lederberg was excluded from writing a chapter in the 1966 book Phage and the Origins of Molecular Biology, a commemoration of molecular biology. According to the science historian Pnina Abir-Am, her exclusion was "incomprehensible" because of her important discoveries in bacteriophage genetics. Abir-Am attributed her exclusion in part to the sexism that prevailed during the 1960s.

As Luigi Luca Cavalli-Sforza later wrote, "Dr. Esther Lederberg has enjoyed the privilege of working with a very famous husband. This has been at times also a setback, because inevitably she has not been credited with as much of the credit as she really deserved. I know that very few people, if any, have had the benefit of as valuable a co-worker as Joshua has had." Her husband Joshua did acknowledge her work and contributions. When the couple attended the 1951 Cold Spring Harbor Symposium, he discussed Esther's doctoral work on E. coli and acknowledged her as second author. Ferrell notes, however, that he did not later acknowledge her work when he wrote an autobiographical account of their discovery of genetic recombination in bacteria.

Lederberg was an advocate for herself and other women during the early years of feminism's second wave. Like many other women scientists at Stanford University, Lederberg struggled for professional recognition. As her husband began his tenure as the head of the genetics department at Stanford in 1959, she and two other women petitioned the dean of the medical school over the lack of women faculty. She was eventually appointed a faculty position as research associate professor in the department of microbiology and immunology, but the position was untenured. According to Abir-Am, Esther had to fight to stay employed at Stanford after divorcing Joshua. Later in 1974 as a senior scientist, she was forced to transition to a position as adjunct professor of medical microbiology, which was effectively a demotion. Her short-term appointment was to be renewed on a rolling basis and was dependent on her securing grant funding.

== Other interests ==
A lifelong musician, Lederberg was a devotee of early music and enjoyed playing medieval, Renaissance, and baroque music on original instruments. She played the recorder and in 1962 founded the Mid-Peninsula Recorder Orchestra, which plays compositions from the 13th century to the present.

Lederberg also loved the works of Charles Dickens and Jane Austen. She belonged to societies devoted to studying and celebrating these two authors, the Dickens Society of Palo Alto and the Jane Austen Society.

== Personal life ==
She married Joshua Lederberg in 1946; they divorced in 1968. In 1989, she met Matthew Simon, an engineer who shared her interest in early music. They married in 1993 and remained married for the rest of her life.

She died in Stanford, California, on November 11, 2006, from pneumonia and congestive heart failure at the age of 83.

== See also ==
- Timeline of women in science
