= Paramutation =

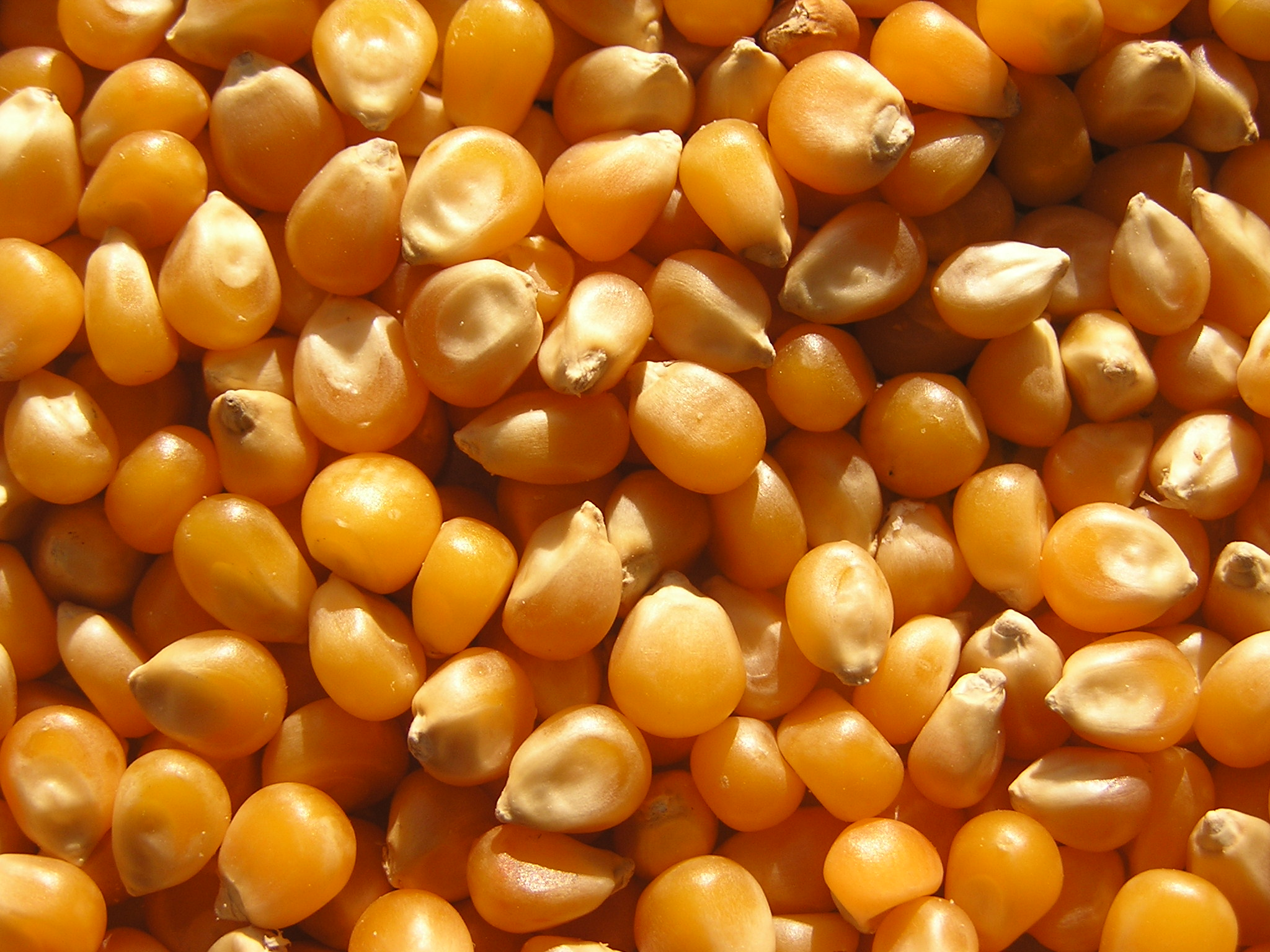
Paramutation was first observed by the effect it had on the color of corn kernels in maize plants

In epigenetics, a paramutation is an interaction between two alleles at a single locus, whereby one allele induces a heritable change in the other allele. The change may be in the pattern of DNA methylation or histone modifications. The allele inducing the change is said to be paramutagenic, while the allele that has been epigenetically altered is termed paramutable. A paramutable allele may have altered levels of gene expression, which may continue in offspring which inherit that allele, even though the paramutagenic allele may no longer be present. Through proper breeding, paramutation can result in siblings that have the same genetic sequence, but with drastically different phenotypes.

Though studied primarily in maize, paramutation has been described in a number of other systems, including animal systems like Drosophila melanogaster and mice. Despite its broad distribution, examples of this phenomenon are scarce and its mechanism is not fully understood.

== History ==
The first description of what would come to be called paramutation was given by William Bateson and Caroline Pellew in 1915, when they described "rogue" peas that always passed their "rogue" phenotype onto their progeny. However, the first formal description of paramutation was given by R.A. Brink at the University of Wisconsin–Madison in the 1950s, who did his work in maize (Zea mays). Brink noticed that specific weakly expressed alleles of the red1 (r1) locus in maize, which encodes a transcription factor that confers red pigment to corn kernels, can heritably change specific strongly expressed alleles to a weaker expression state. The weaker expression state adopted by the changed allele is heritable and can, in turn, change the expression state of other active alleles in a process termed secondary paramutation. Brink showed that the influence of the paramutagenic allele could persist for many generations.

== Description ==
The alleles that cause heritable changes in the alleles they come into contact which are called paramutagenic, and the alleles modified by them are paramutable. Alleles that do not take part in this interaction are called neutral. When present together in an organism, the paramutable allele is converted to the paramutagenic allele, and retains its paramutagenicity in subsequent generations. No change in DNA sequence accompanies this transformation, but instead epigenetic modifications (e.g. DNA methylation) differentiate the paramutagenic from paramutable alleles. In most cases, it is the paramutable allele that is highly transcribed and the paramutagenic allele that undergoes little to no transcription.

The first described and most extensively researched example is the r1 locus in maize. The gene at this locus, when actively transcribed, codes for a transcription factor that promotes anthocyanin production, resulting in kernels with a purple color. One allele at this locus, referred to as B', is capable of causing methylation at the other allele, B-I. This methylation results in reduced transcription and, as a result, decreased anthocyanin production. These alleles do not differ in DNA sequence, but they do differ in their degree of DNA methylation. As with other examples of paramutation, this change of the B-I allele to the B' allele is stable and heritable. Other, similar examples of paramutation exist at other maize loci, as well as in other plants such as the model system Arabidopsis thaliana and transgenic petunias.

Paramutation has also been documented in animals such as fruit flies, C. elegans, and mice.

== Mechanism ==
Though the specific mechanisms by which paramutation acts vary from organism to organism, all well-documented cases point towards epigenetic modification and RNA-silencing as the underlying mechanism for paramutation.

In the case of the r1 locus in maize, DNA methylation of a region of tandem repeats near the coding region of the gene is characteristic of the paramutagenic B' allele, and when the paramutable B-I allele becomes paramutagenic, it too takes on the same DNA methylation pattern. In order for this methylation to be successfully transferred, a number of genes coding for RNA-dependent RNA polymerases and other components of RNA-silencing pathways are required, suggesting that paramutation is mediated via endogenous RNA-silencing pathways. The transcription of short interfering RNAs from the tandem repeat regions corroborates this. In animal systems such as Drosophila, piRNAs have also been implicated in mediating paramutation. In that case, paramutation can occur in absence of any possible pairing between the paramutagenic and the paramutated loci and can be stable other more than 50 generations. In addition to the characteristic DNA methylation state changes, changes in histone modification patterns in the methylated DNA regions, and/or the requirement of histone modifying proteins to mediate paramutation have also been noted in multiple systems. It has been suggested that these histone modifications play a role in maintaining the paramutated state. The previously mentioned tandem repeat region in the r1 locus is also typical of other loci showing paramutation or paramutation-like phenomena.

However, it has been noted that it is not possible to explain all occurrences and features of paramutation with what is known about RNAi-mediated transcriptional silencing, suggesting that other pathways and/or mechanisms are also at play.

== Implications ==
It has been speculated that in any particular population, relatively few genes would show observable paramutation since the high penetrance of paramutagenic alleles (like B' at the r1 locus in maize) would drive either the paramutagenic or paramutable allele to fixation. Paramutation at other loci with paramutagenic alleles with lower penetrance may persist, however, which may need to be taken into account by plant breeders.

Since there are examples of paramutation, or paramutation-like phenomena, in animals such as fruit flies and mice, it has been suggested that paramutation may explain the occurrence of some human diseases that exhibit non-Mendelian inheritance patterns.
