= Joshua Lederberg =

American molecular biologist (1925–2008)

Joshua Lederberg ForMemRS
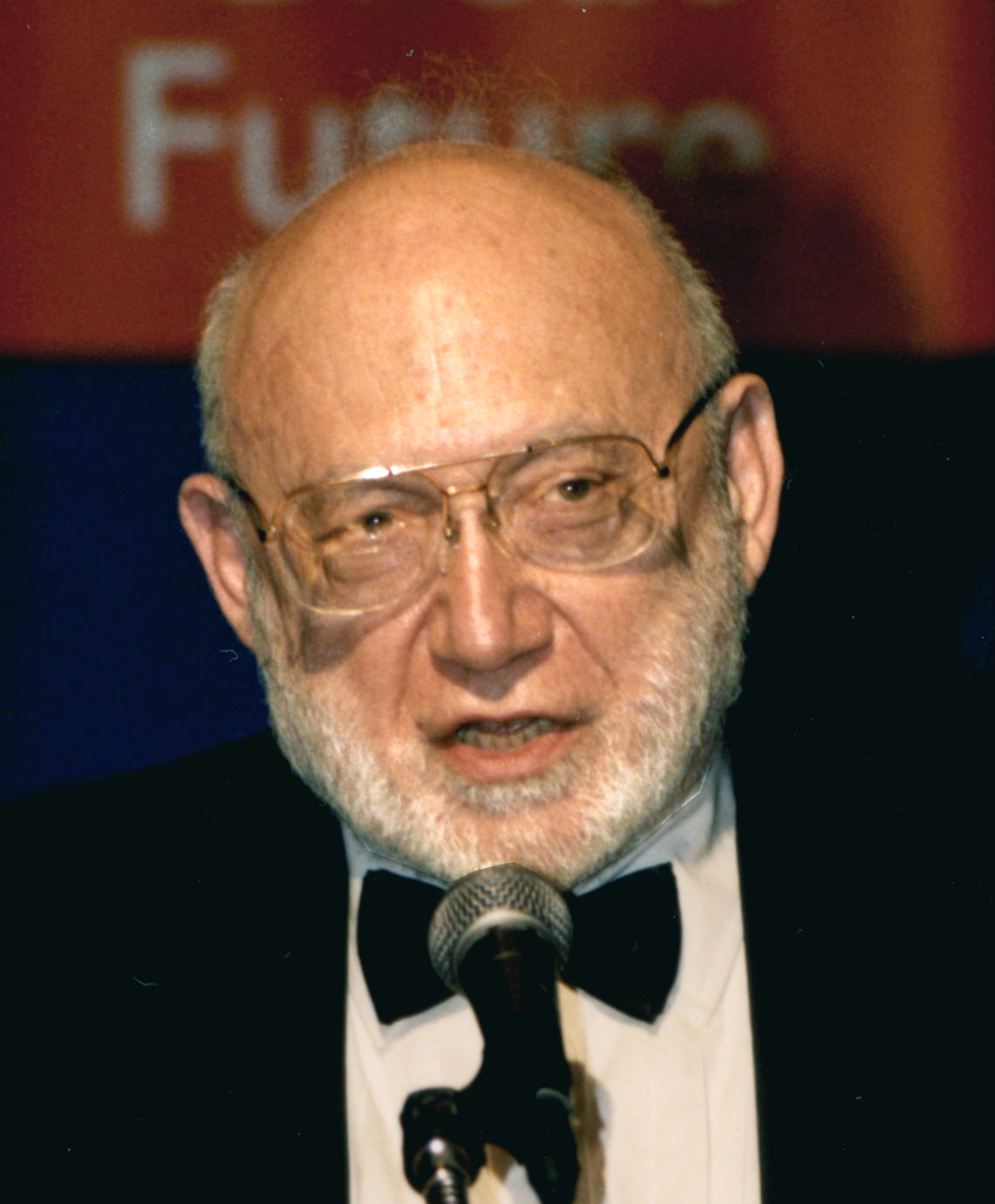
- Lederberg

5th President of Rockefeller University
- In office 1978–1990
- Preceded by: Frederick Seitz
- Succeeded by: David Baltimore

Personal details
- Born: May 23, 1925 Montclair, New Jersey
- Died: February 2, 2008 (aged 82) New York City
- Spouse(s): Esther Miriam Zimmer (1946–1966; divorced); Marguerite Stein Kirsch (1968–2008; 1 child, 1 stepchild)
- Education: Columbia University; Yale University
- Scientific career
- Known for: Neurospora crassa Bacterial conjugation Dendral; Astrobiology; Transduction
- Awards: Nobel Prize in Physiology or Medicine (1958); National Medal of Science (1989); Presidential Medal of Freedom (2006)
- Fields: Microbiologist
- Thesis: Genetic recombination in Escherichia coli (1947)
- Doctoral advisor: Edward Tatum
- Doctoral students: Norton Zinder

Joshua Lederberg ForMemRS (May 23, 1925 – February 2, 2008) was an American molecular biologist known for his work in microbial genetics, artificial intelligence, and the United States space program. He was 33 years old when he won the 1958 Nobel Prize in Physiology or Medicine for discovering that bacteria can mate and exchange genes (bacterial conjugation); work that was conducted alongside his wife Esther, who was uncredited for her contributions. He shared the prize with Edward Tatum and George Beadle, who won for their work with genetics.

In addition to his contributions to biology, Lederberg did extensive research in artificial intelligence. This included work in the NASA experimental programs seeking life on Mars and the chemistry expert system Dendral.

== Early life and education ==
Lederberg was born in Montclair, New Jersey, to a Jewish family, son of Esther Goldenbaum Schulman Lederberg and Rabbi Zvi Hirsch Lederberg, in 1925, and moved to Washington Heights, Manhattan as an infant. He had two younger brothers. Lederberg graduated from Stuyvesant High School in New York City at the age of 15 in 1941. After graduation, he was allowed lab space as part of the American Institute Science Laboratory, a forerunner of the Westinghouse Science Talent Search. He enrolled in Columbia University in 1941, majoring in zoology. Under the mentorship of Francis J. Ryan, he conducted biochemical and genetic studies on the bread mold Neurospora crassa. Intending to receive his MD and fulfill his military service obligations, Lederberg worked as a hospital corpsman during 1943 in the clinical pathology laboratory at St. Albans Naval Hospital, where he examined sailors' blood and stool samples for malaria. He went on to receive his undergraduate degree in 1944.

== Bacterial genetics ==
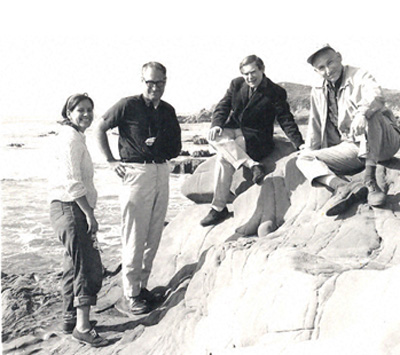
Lederberg alongside his wife, esteemed microbiologist and feminist figure, Esther Lederberg and their friends Gunther Stent and Sydney Brenner in 1965

Joshua Lederberg began medical studies at Columbia's College of Physicians and Surgeons while continuing to perform experiments. Inspired by Oswald Avery's discovery of the importance of DNA, Lederberg began to investigate his hypothesis that, contrary to prevailing opinion, bacteria did not simply pass down exact copies of genetic information, making all cells in a lineage essentially clones. After making little progress at Columbia, Lederberg wrote to Edward Tatum, Ryan's post-doctoral mentor, proposing a collaboration. In 1946 and 1947, Lederberg took a leave of absence to study under the mentorship of Tatum at Yale University. Lederberg and Tatum showed that the bacterium Escherichia coli entered a sexual phase during which it could share genetic information through bacterial conjugation. With this discovery and some mapping of the E. coli chromosome, Lederberg was able to receive his Ph.D. from Yale University in 1947. Joshua married Esther Miriam Zimmer (herself a student of Edward Tatum) on December 13, 1946.

Instead of returning to Columbia to finish his medical degree, Lederberg chose to accept an offer of an assistant professorship in genetics at the University of Wisconsin–Madison. His wife Esther Lederberg went with him to Wisconsin. She received her doctorate there in 1950.

Joshua Lederberg and Norton Zinder showed in 1951 that genetic material could be transferred from one strain of the bacterium Salmonella typhimurium to another using viral material as an intermediary step. This process is called transduction. In 1956, M. Laurance Morse, Esther Lederberg and Joshua Lederberg also discovered specialized transduction. The research in specialized transduction focused upon lambda phage infection of E. coli. Transduction and specialized transduction explained how bacteria of different species could gain resistance to the same antibiotic very quickly.

During her time in Joshua Lederberg's laboratory, Esther Lederberg also discovered fertility factor F, later publishing with Joshua Lederberg and Luigi Luca Cavalli-Sforza. In 1956, the Society of Illinois Bacteriologists simultaneously awarded Joshua Lederberg and Esther Lederberg the Pasteur Medal, for "their outstanding contributions to the fields of microbiology and genetics".

In 1957, Joshua Lederberg founded the Department of Medical Genetics at the University of Wisconsin–Madison. He has held visiting professorship in Bacteriology at the University of California, Berkeley in summer 1950 and University of Melbourne (1957). Also in 1957, he was elected to the National Academy of Sciences.

Sir Gustav Nossal views Lederberg as his mentor, describing him as "lightning fast" and "loving a robust debate."

== Post Nobel Prize research ==
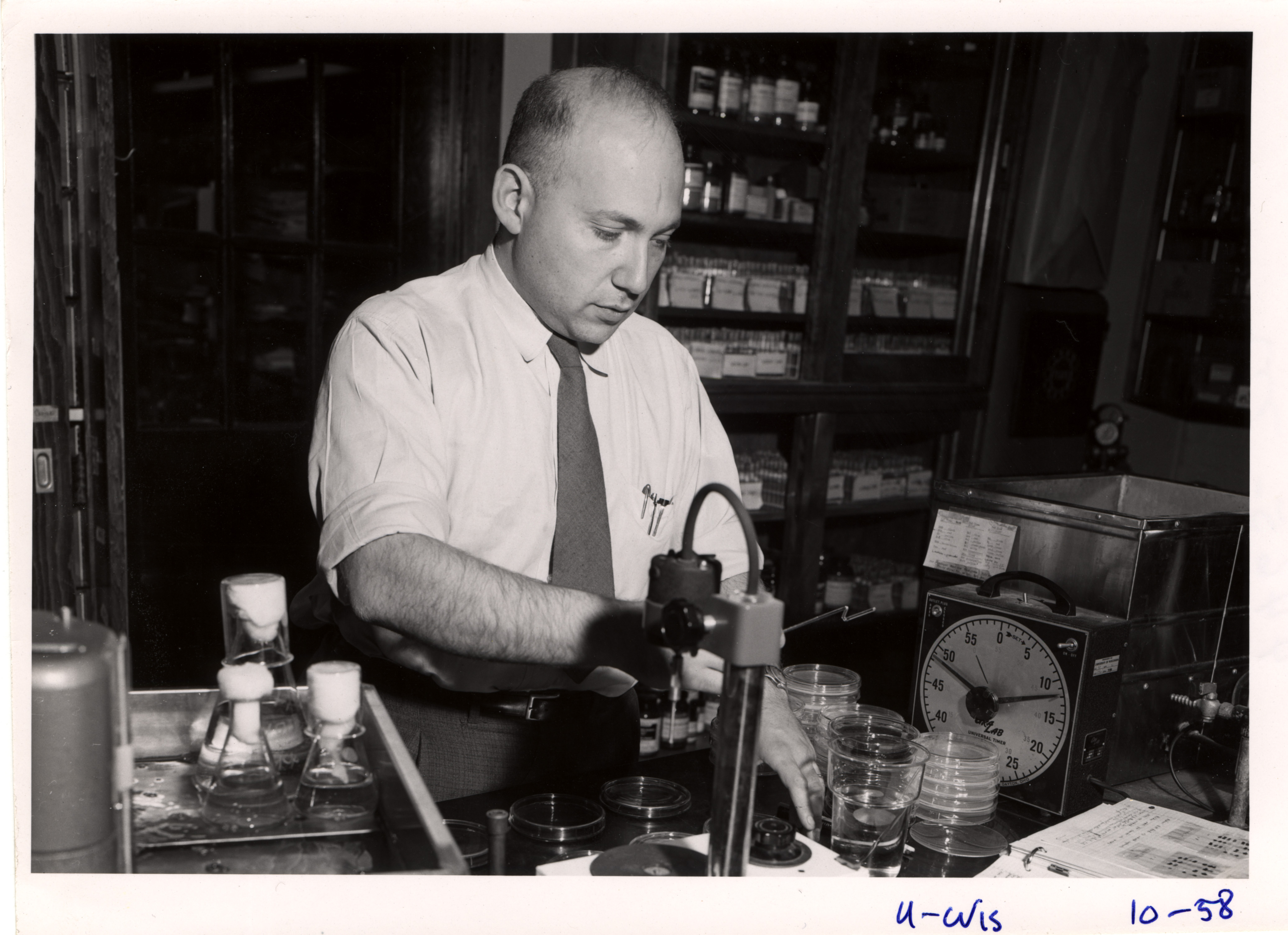
Lederberg in 1958

In 1958, Joshua Lederberg received the Nobel Prize and moved to Stanford University, where he was the founder and chairman of the Department of Genetics. He collaborated with Frank Macfarlane Burnet to study viral antibodies.

With the launching of Sputnik in 1957, Lederberg became concerned about the biological impact of space exploration. In a letter to the National Academies of Sciences, he outlined his concerns that extraterrestrial microbes might gain entry to Earth onboard spacecraft, causing catastrophic diseases. He also argued that, conversely, microbial contamination of manmade satellites and probes may obscure the search for extraterrestrial life. He advised quarantine for returning astronauts and equipment and sterilization of equipment prior to launch. Teaming up with Carl Sagan, his public advocacy for what he termed exobiology helped expand the role of biology in NASA.

Lederberg was elected to the American Academy of Arts and Sciences in 1959 and the American Philosophical Society in 1960.

In the 1960s, he collaborated with Edward Feigenbaum in Stanford's computer science department to develop DENDRAL.

In 1978, he became the president of Rockefeller University, until he stepped down in 1990 and became professor-emeritus of molecular genetics and informatics at Rockefeller University, reflecting his extensive research and publications in these disciplines.

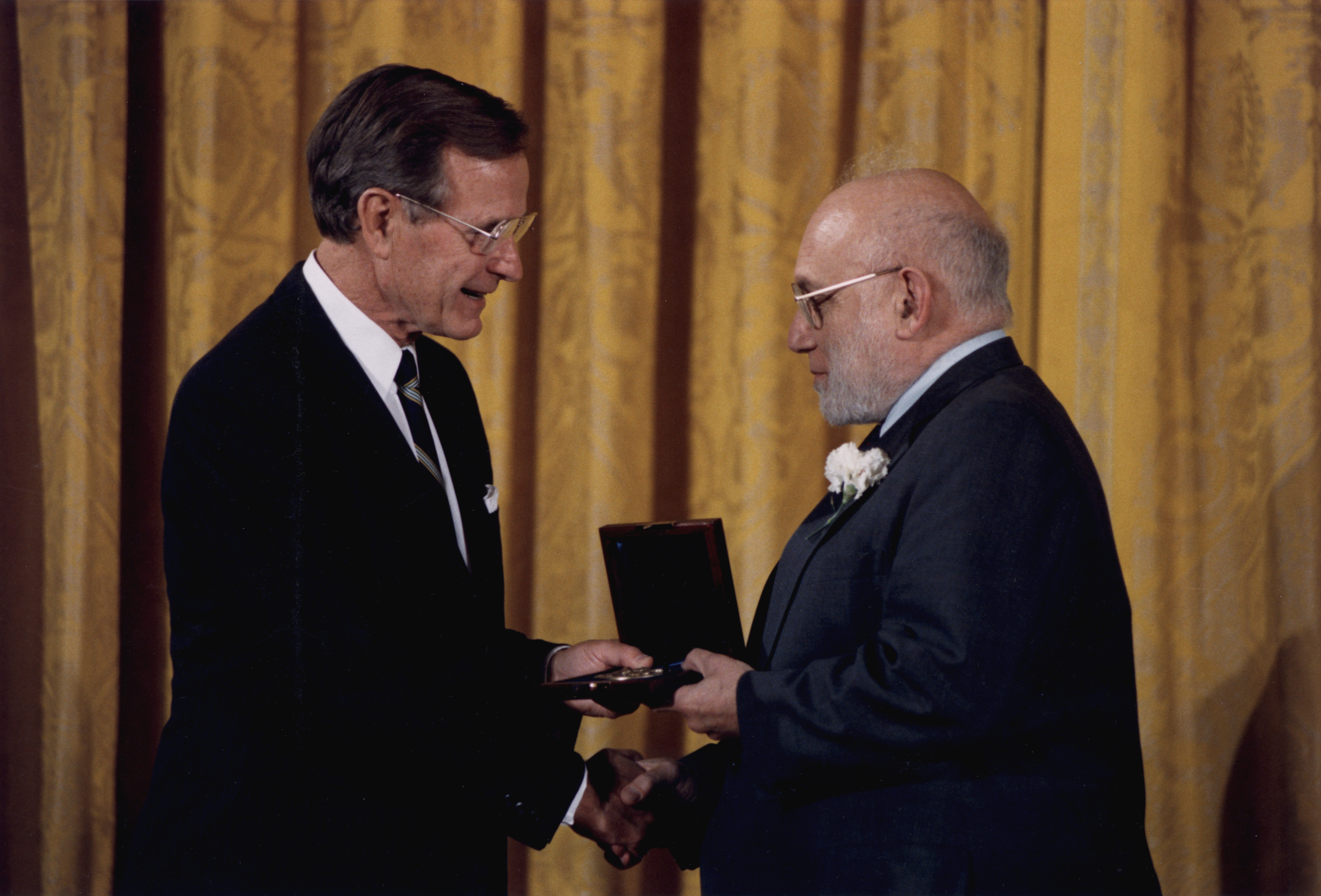
Lederberg (right) receiving The National Medal of Science from George H. W. Bush

Throughout his career, Lederberg was active as a scientific advisor to the U.S. government. Starting in 1950, he was a member of various panels of the Presidential Science Advisory Committee. In 1979, he became a member of the U.S. Defense Science Board and the chairman of President Jimmy Carter's President's Cancer Panel. In 1989, he received National Medal of Science for his contributions to the scientific world. In 1994, he headed the Department of Defense's Task Force on Persian Gulf War Health Effects, which investigated Gulf War Syndrome.

During a 1986 fact finding mission of the 1979 Soviet Union epidemic of anthrax bacteria that killed 66 people in the city of Sverdlovsk (now Yekaterinburg, Russia), Lederberg sided with Soviets that the anthrax outbreak was from animal to human transmission stating, "Wild rumors do spread around every epidemic." "The current Soviet account is very likely to be true." After the fall of the Soviet Union and subsequent US investigations in the early 1990s, a team of scientists confirmed the outbreak was caused by a release of an aerosol of anthrax pathogen from a nearby military facility, the lab leak is one of the deadliest ever documented.

== Political and social thought ==
=== Euphenics ===
Euphenics, which literally means "good appearance" or "normal appearing", is the science of making phenotypic improvements to humans after birth, generally to affect a problematic genetic condition. Lederberg coined the term in the 1960s to differentiate this practice from eugenics, which was both widely unpopular at the time and he had seen as having been "perverted to justify unthinkable inhumanity". (Some commentators nonetheless consider this to be a form of eugenics.) He emphasized that the genetic manipulation he described was intended to work on phenotype rather than genotype; he felt it was more feasible to positively change an individual's phenotype through gene therapies or enzyme replacement rather than attempt to change the course of evolution as eugenics proposed. Theodosius Dobzhansky, an outspoken proponent of euphenics, argued that by improving genetic conditions so that people could live normal, healthy lives, people could lessen the impact of genetic conditions, thus lowering future interest in eugenics or other kinds of genetic manipulation.

In the 1970s, considerable effort was put towards the developing field of euphenics since it was seen as a positive form of genetic engineering. One of the first publicized applications of euphenics was the use of vitamins containing folic acid during pregnancy to combat neural-tube deficiencies such as spina bifida in the 1970s. However, medical science had been using euphenic strategies years before the term itself was coined. Euphenics is used today in the medical community to more generally refer to methods of affecting a genetic condition in a positive manner through diet, lifestyle or environment, such as the use of insulin to control diabetes or installation of a pacemaker to offset a heart defect.

== Awards and accolades ==
Impact crater Lederberg in Xanthe Terra on Mars

- The Benjamin Franklin Medal for Distinguished Achievement in the Sciences of the American Philosophical Society, 2002.
- The Presidential Medal of Freedom, 2006.
- In Lederberg's honor, the 87 km diameter large impact crater in Xanthe Terra on the surface of Mars was named in the year 2012.

== Personal ==
Lederberg married fellow scientist Esther Miriam Zimmer in 1946; they divorced in 1966. He married psychiatrist Marguerite Stein Kirsch in 1968. He was survived by Marguerite, their daughter, Anne Lederberg, and his stepson, David Kirsch.

== See also ==
- Euthenics
- List of Jewish Nobel laureates
- LCF notation
