= Priscilla Wald =

American English professor and literary critic

- Born: Priscilla Beth Wald; 1958 (age 67–68)
- Education: Yale University; Columbia University
- Occupations: English Professor, Literary Critic

Priscilla Wald (born 1958) is Professor of English and Women's Studies at Duke University and the author of Constituting Americans: Cultural Anxiety and Narrative Form (1995) and Contagious: Cultures, Carriers, and the Outbreak Narrative (2008). She has published widely on the intersections of science, medicine, law, and literature. She is currently at work on a book-length study entitled Human Being After Genocide, which chronicles the challenge to conceptions of human being that emerged from scientific and technological innovation in the wake of the Second World War, as well as a series of essays that explore the impact of genomics on current thinking about categories of social, biological and political belonging and on the narrative of human history. Wald is the current editor of American Literature. She served as the president of the American Studies Association (ASA) from 2011-2012.

Wald received her B.A. in English from Yale University (class of 1980) and her M.A. and Ph.D. in English from Columbia University (1981, 1987). She is married to the poet and literary critic Joseph Donahue.

== Works ==
Constituting Americans: Cultural Anxiety and Narrative Form (Duke University Press, 1995). ISBN 978-0-822-31547-6
Contagious: Cultures, Carriers, and the Outbreak Narrative (Duke University Press, 2008). ISBN 978-0-822-34153-6
