= The Dickens Society =

Non-profit organization

The Dickens Society is a non-profit organization founded on 29 December 1970 by 40 participants at the Modern Language Association Convention in New York City. The Dickens Society's purpose is "to conduct, further, and support research, publication, instruction, and general interest in the life, times, and literature of Charles John Huffam Dickens (7 February 1812 – 9 June 1870)." In Dickens After Dickens (2020), Emily Bell notes, "The rise of neo-Victorian fiction in the 1960s further deepened the public interest in the author, and the establishment of the Dickens Society in 1970 represented another formal, international recognition of the value of academic study of Dickens." According to David Paroissien, "The Dickens Society was always meant to be an international" organization in contrast to the Dickens Fellowship, explicitly functioning as a "service society" that "would dedicate itself to supporting the scholarly needs of its members."

== Annual symposium ==
To increase engagement from its global membership in both hemispheres, the Dickens Society alternates its symposium location between various institutions and major cities in North America or Europe. One important feature of the event is that there is no keynote; graduate students, early career researchers, independent scholars, and tenured faculty are allotted equal space and time to present research. Delegates hail "from universities situated in Europe, India, Africa, the Middle East, the US and Canada."

== Scholarships ==
Each year, the Dickens Society funds several competitive scholarly awards and other financial support for its members, encouraging "research into almost anything to do with Dickens." As Nancy Aycock Metz states, "The society still honors many of the original goals – an annual MLA seminar, transatlantic scholarly exchanges, prizes and stipends to support the work of young professionals." The David Paroissien Prize, named for a notable founding member and Dickens Quarterly editor, is awarded "to the best peer-reviewed essay on Dickens published in a journal or edited collection." The Robert B. Partlow Jr. Prize, which honors another founding member, former officer, and influential Dickensian scholar, is conferred upon the best paper written and submitted prior to the annual symposium by a graduate student, independent scholar, or untenured faculty member.

== Dickens Quarterly ==
The journal of The Dickens Society, first entitled Dickens Studies Newsletter, predated the founding of the Society by a year. First published in 1970, and edited by Robert Patten, the journal's title was changed to Dickens Quarterly in March 1984. Dickens Quarterly's long-time general editor was the late scholar David Paroissien, who published a detailed retrospect about the organization and journal's history in 1996 and again in 2010. Currently, it is edited by Dominic Rainsford (Aarhus University).

Dickens Quarterly is published four times a year by Johns Hopkins University Press. A subscription to it is included in the cost of annual membership. Recent issues are featured on Project Muse, and its archive appears on JSTOR. Together with the Dickensian (Dickens Fellowship) and Dickens Studies Annual, it forms a triad of leading publications devoted to presenting new research into the life and times of Charles Dickens.
