= 1771 =

1771 in various calendars
- Gregorian calendar: 1771; MDCCLXXI
- Ab urbe condita: 2524
- Armenian calendar: 1220; ԹՎ ՌՄԻ
- Assyrian calendar: 6521
- Balinese saka calendar: 1692–1693
- Bengali calendar: 1177–1178
- Berber calendar: 2721
- British Regnal year: 11 Geo. 3 – 12 Geo. 3
- Buddhist calendar: 2315
- Burmese calendar: 1133
- Byzantine calendar: 7279–7280
- Chinese calendar: 庚寅年 (Metal Tiger); 4468 or 4261 — to — 辛卯年 (Metal Rabbit); 4469 or 4262
- Coptic calendar: 1487–1488
- Discordian calendar: 2937
- Ethiopian calendar: 1763–1764
- Hebrew calendar: 5531–5532
- Hindu calendars
- Vikram Samvat: 1827–1828
- Shaka Samvat: 1692–1693
- Kali Yuga: 4871–4872
- Holocene calendar: 11771
- Igbo calendar: 771–772
- Iranian calendar: 1149–1150
- Islamic calendar: 1184–1185
- Japanese calendar: Meiwa 8 (明和８年)
- Javanese calendar: 1696–1697
- Julian calendar: Gregorian minus 11 days
- Korean calendar: 4104
- Minguo calendar: 141 before ROC 民前141年
- Nanakshahi calendar: 303
- Thai solar calendar: 2313–2314
- Tibetan calendar: ལྕགས་ཕོ་སྟག་ལོ་ (male Iron-Tiger); 1897 or 1516 or 744 — to — ལྕགས་མོ་ཡོས་ལོ་ (female Iron-Hare); 1898 or 1517 or 745

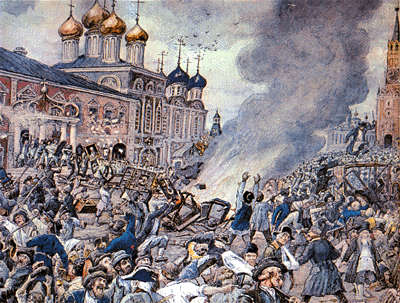
September 15–17:Plague Riot in Moscow

1771 (MDCCLXXI) was a common year starting on Tuesday of the Gregorian calendar and a common year starting on Saturday of the Julian calendar, the 1771st year of the Common Era (CE) and Anno Domini (AD) designations, the 771st year of the 2nd millennium, the 71st year of the 18th century, and the 2nd year of the 1770s decade. As of the start of 1771, the Gregorian calendar was 11 days ahead of the Julian calendar, which remained in localized use until 1923.

== Events ==
=== January– March ===
- January 5 – The Great Kalmyk (Torghut Migration) is led by Ubashi Khan, from the east bank of the Lower Volga River back to the homeland of Dzungaria, at this time under Qing dynasty rule.
- January 9 – Emperor Go-Momozono accedes to the throne of Tokugawa shogunate Japan following his aunt's abdication.
- February 12 – Upon the death of Adolf Frederick, he is succeeded as King of Sweden by his son Gustav III. At the time, however, Gustav is unaware of this, since he is abroad in Paris; the news of his father's death reaches him about a month later.
- March – War of the Regulation: North Carolina Governor William Tryon raises a militia to put down the long-running uprising of backcountry militias against North Carolina's colonial government.
- March 12 – The North Carolina General Assembly establishes Wake County (named for Margaret Wake, the wife of North Carolina Royal Governor William Tryon) from portions of Cumberland, Johnston and Orange counties. Bloomsberry (later known as Wake Courthouse) is made the informal county seat.
- March 15 – The Smeatonian Society of Civil Engineers first meets in London, the world's oldest engineering society.

=== April–June ===
- April 4 – The first quarantines are started in Moscow and Saint Petersburg to fight the bubonic plague epidemic. Over the next 12 months, more than 52,000 people die from the plague in Moscow alone.
- May – Three battles of Sarbakusa: An alliance of three of the most powerful aristocrats of Ethiopia (Goshu of Amhara, Wand Bewossen and Fasil of Damot) defeats Ras Mikael Sehul and Emperor Tekle Haymanot II, taking control of Ethiopia.
- May 11 – War of the Regulation: North Carolina Governor William Tryon marches his military out of Hillsborough, to come to the aid of General Hugh Waddell's beleaguered forces. Tryon's army stops at Alamance Creek, 5 miles (8.0 km) away from the Regulator army.
- May 16 – War of the Regulation – Battle of Alamance: Regulators reject an appeal by Governor Tryon to disperse peacefully. Governor Tryon's forces crush the rebellion, causing many Regulators to move to frontier areas outside of North Carolina.
- May 23 – Battle of Lanckorona: A force of 4,000 Russians under Alexander Suvorov defeat a Polish formation of 1,300 men.
- June 11 – The Society of Gentlemen Supporters of the Bill of Rights meets in the London Tavern and changes its platform to a comprehensive program for British parliamentary reform in advance of the next election.

=== July–September ===
- July 12 – The first voyage of James Cook around the world ends as HMS Endeavour returns to England after almost three years.
- July 13 – Russo-Turkish War (1768–74): Russian forces occupy the Crimea, under Prince Vasily Dolgorukov.
- July 17 – Bloody Falls massacre: Chipewyan chief Matonabbee, traveling as the guide to Samuel Hearne on his Arctic overland journey, massacres a group of unsuspecting Inuit.
- August 8 – The first recorded town cricket match is played, at Horsham, England.
- September 8 – In California, Fathers Pedro Cambon and Angel Somera found Mission Vieja, later called, Mission San Gabriel Arcángel, in what becomes San Gabriel, California.
- September 15–17 – The Moscow plague riot results from an outbreak of bubonic plague, which kills 57,000.

=== October–December ===
- October 9 – The Dutch merchant ship Vrouw Maria sinks off the coast of Finland; Captain Raymund Lourens and his crew escape unharmed.
- October 17 – The opera Ascanio in Alba by Wolfgang Amadeus Mozart, age 15, premieres in Milan.
- November 3 – Siamese conquest of Ha Tien ends the Siamese civil war of 1767-71.
- November 16 – During the night the River Tyne in the north of England floods, destroying many bridges and killing several people; the replacement main bridge at Newcastle upon Tyne will not be completed until 1781.
- December 3 – The cause of action in Sommersett's Case, which eventually leads to the end of slavery in Great Britain, begins when escaped slave James Somerset is found imprisoned on the ship Ann and Mary.
- December 31 – Men, women and children of the Choctaw and Chickasaw tribes begin a 23-day encampment at Mobile, part of the British colony of West Florida, at the invitation of British Southern Indian superintendent John Stuart, as their leaders negotiate a treaty.

=== Date unknown ===
- The territory of Baden-Baden is inherited by Charles Frederick, Margrave of Baden-Durlach, reunifying the territories of Baden.
- The trade monopoly with Iceland is transferred to the Danish crown.
- The North Carolina General Assembly passes an act establishing the town of Martinsborough, named for Royal Governor Josiah Martin, on the land of Richard Evans, which will serve as the seat of Pitt County.
- Construction of the Putuo Zongcheng Temple complex in Chengde, China is completed during the reign of the Qianlong Emperor.
- Limoges porcelain manufacture is established in France.
- Slovene literature: István Küzmics, the Hungarian Slovene writer and evangelical pastor, publishes (in Halle) the Nouvi Zákon, a translation of the New Testament into the Prekmurje Slovene language, with discrete South Slavic artwork.

== Births ==
- January 17 – Charles Brockden Brown, American novelist, editor, historian (d. 1810)
- February 14 – Hanne Tott, Danish circus artist, circus manager (d. 1826)
- March 16 – Antoine-Jean Gros, French painter (d. 1835)
- March 20 – Heinrich Clauren, German author (d. 1854)
- March 25 – Germanos III of Old Patras, Greek Metropolitan Bishop of Patras (d. 1826)
- April 3 – Hans Nielsen Huge, Norwegian revivalist, entrepreneur (d. 1824)
- April 13 – Richard Trevithick, English inventor (d. 1833)
- April 18 – Karl Philipp, Prince of Schwarzenberg, Austrian field marshal (d. 1820)
- April 27 – Jean Rapp, French general (d. 1821)
- May 1 – Cajsa Wahllund, Finnish restaurateur (d. 1843)
- May 11 – Laskarina Bouboulina, Greek independence heroine (d. 1825)

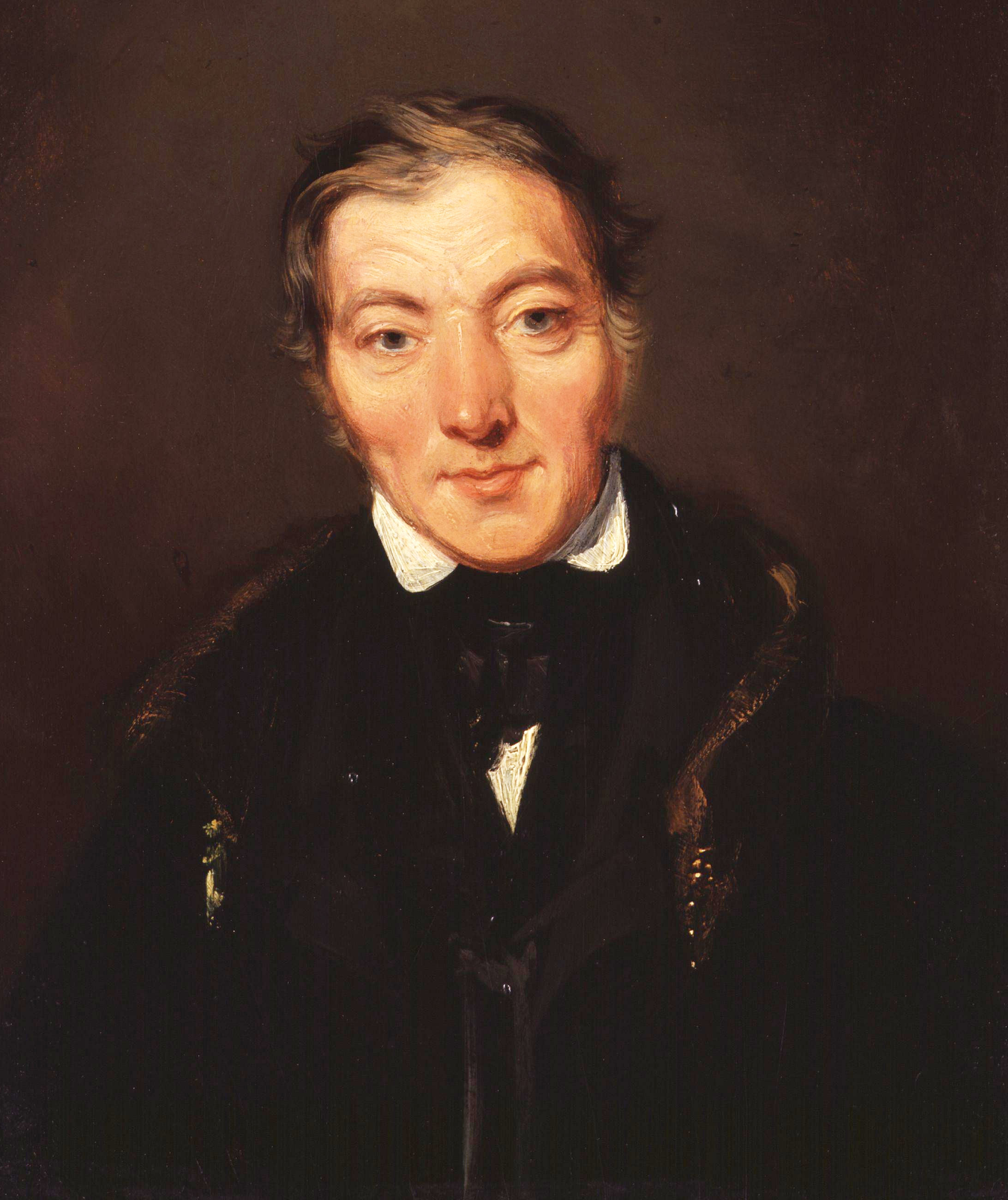
Robert Owen

- May 14 – Robert Owen, Welsh social reformer (d. 1858)
- May 16 – Louis Henri Loison, French general (d. 1816)

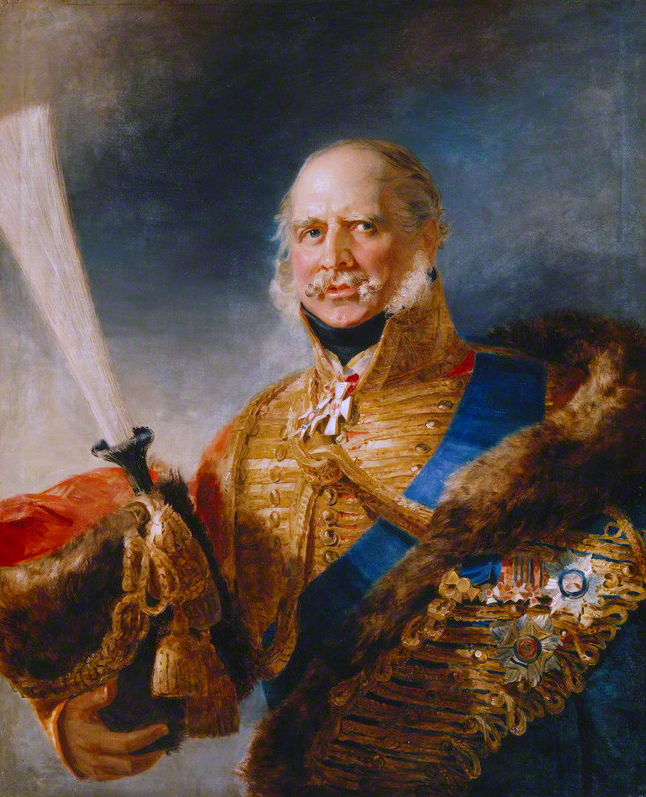
Ernest Augustus, King of Hanover

- June 5 – Ernest Augustus, King of Hanover (d. 1851)
- June 24 – Éleuthère Irénée du Pont, French-American chemist, industrialist (d. 1834)
- August 15 – Sir Walter Scott, Scottish novelist, poet (d. 1832)
- September 5 – Archduke Charles of Austria, Austrian general, statesman (d. 1847)
- September 11 – Mungo Park, Scottish explorer (d. 1806)
- September 17 – Johann August Apel, German writer, jurist (d. 1816)
- September 23 – Emperor Kōkaku of Japan (d. 1840)
- October 9 – Frederick William, Duke of Brunswick-Wolfenbüttel (d. 1815)
- October 23 – Jean-Andoche Junot, French general (d. 1813)
- November 14 – Xavier Bichat, French anatomist and pathologist (d. 1802)
- December 14 – Regina von Siebold, German physician and obstetrician (d. 1849)
- December 27 – William Johnson, Associate Justice of the Supreme Court of the United States (d. 1834)
- Unknown – William Lloyd, Welsh Anglican priest turned schoolteacher and Methodist preacher (d. 1841)

== Deaths ==
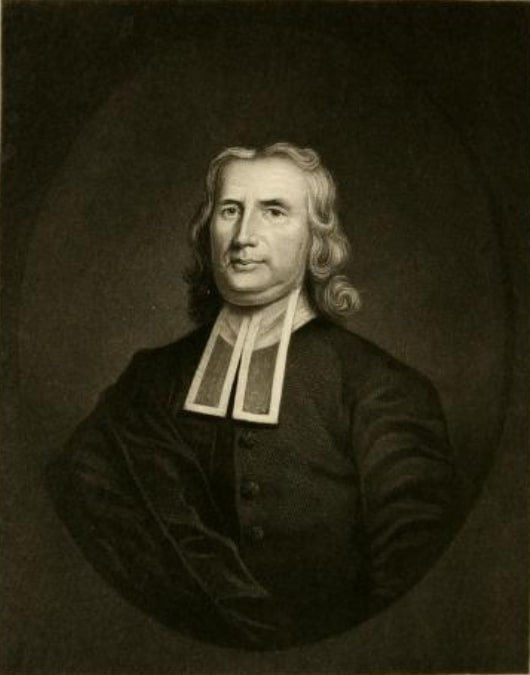
Rev. Samuel Phillips

- January 5 – John Russell, 4th Duke of Bedford, British statesman (b. 1710)
- January 11 – Jean-Baptiste de Boyer, Marquis d'Argens, French writer (b. 1704)
- January 23 – Jean Charles de Saint-Nectaire, French general (b. 1685)
- February 12 – King Adolf Frederick of Sweden (b. 1710)
- February 20 – Jean-Jacques d'Ortous de Mairan, French geophysicist (b. 1678)
- March 12 – Louis August le Clerc, French-born sculptor (b. 1688)
- March 20 – Louis-Michel van Loo, French painter (b. 1707)

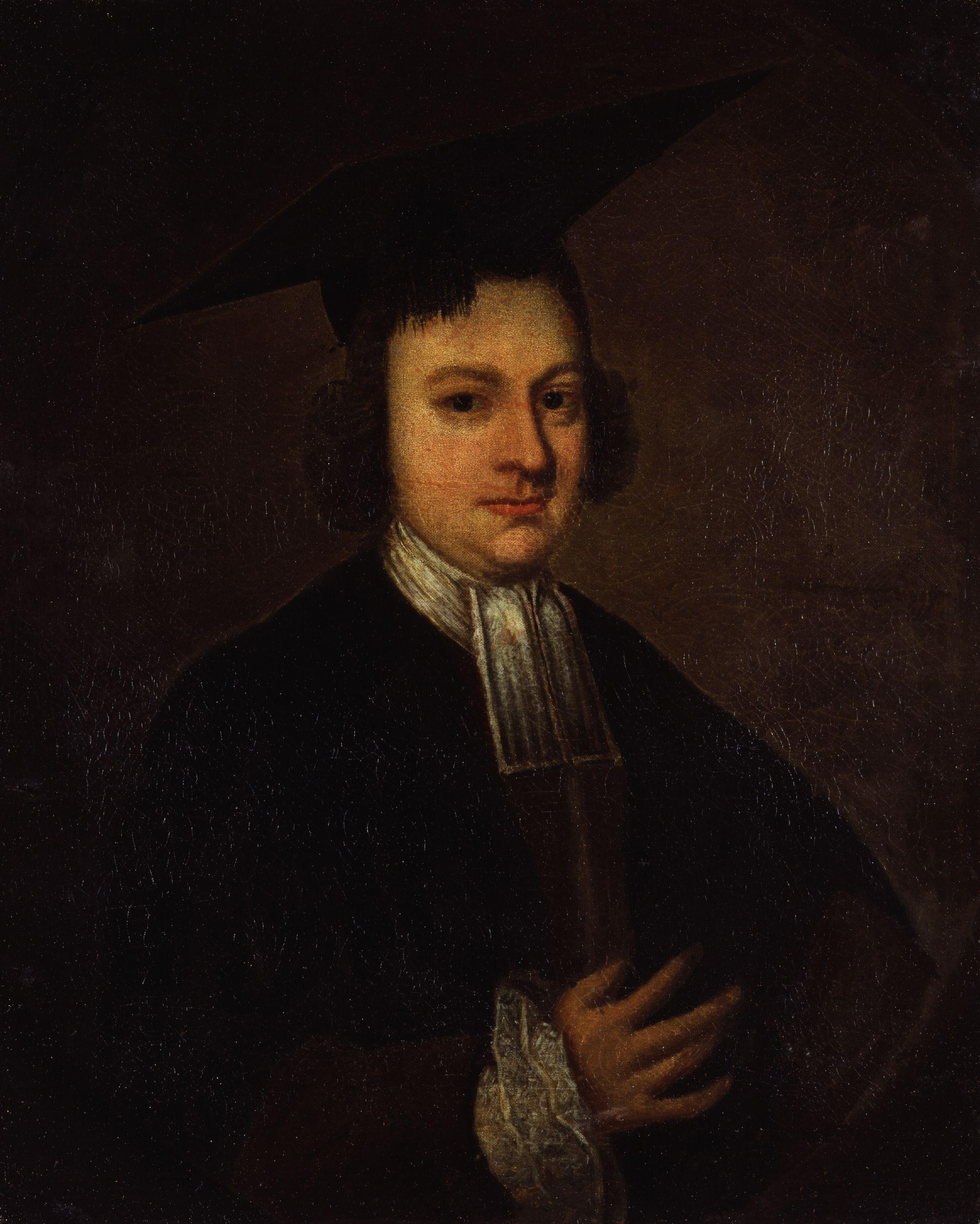
Christopher Smart

- May 21 – Christopher Smart, English poet (b. 1722)
- May 27 – Anthony Ashley Cooper, 4th Earl of Shaftesbury, English philanthropist (b. 1711)
- June 5 – Samuel Phillips (reverend), colonial American minister, 1st Pastor of the South Church in Andover (b. 1690)
- June 8 – George Montagu-Dunk, 2nd Earl of Halifax, English statesman (b. 1716)
- July 14 – Chen Hongmou, Chinese scholar and philosopher (b. 1696)
- July 22 – William Whitmore (British Army officer), British general (b. 1714)
- July 30 – Thomas Gray, English writer (b. 1716)
- September 13 – John Gambold, British bishop (b. 1711)
- September 17 – Tobias Smollett, Scottish novelist (b. 1721)
- October 31 – Charles-Nicolas d'Oultremont, Roman Catholic bishop (b. 1716)
- November 4 – Charles Lucas (politician), Irish apothecary (b. 1713)
- November 6 – John Bevis, English physician, astronomer (b. 1695)
- November 13 – Konrad Ernst Ackermann, German actor (b. 1712)

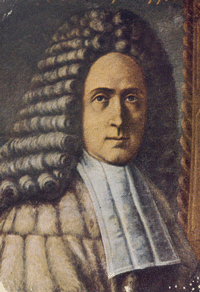
Giovanni Battista Morgagni

- December 6 – Giovanni Battista Morgagni, Italian anatomist (b. 1682)
- December 23 – Marie-Marguerite d'Youville, Canadian saint (b. 1701)
- December 26 – Claude Adrien Helvétius, French philosopher (b. 1715)
- December 27 – Henri Pitot, Italian-born French engineer (b. 1695)
