= Senator Phillips =

Senator Phillips may refer to:

- Albert L. Phillips (1824–?), Wisconsin State Senate
- Charles H. Phillips (1859–1938), Wisconsin State Senate
- Charles Phillips (Wisconsin politician, born 1824) (1824–1879), Wisconsin State Senate
- Christopher H. Phillips (1920–2008), Massachusetts State Senate
- Elaine Phillips (fl. 2010s), New York State Senate
- James T. Phillips (1953–2014), New Jersey State Senate
- Jim Phillips Sr. (1931–2018), North Carolina State Senate
- Jimmy Phillips (politician) (1913–2002), Texas State Senate
- John R. Phillips (American politician) (1887–1983), California
- John Phillips (mayor) (1770–1823), Massachusetts State Senate
- John Phillips (Wisconsin politician) (1823–1903), Wisconsin State Senate
- Orie Leon Phillips (1885–1974), New Mexico State Senate
- Randy Phillips (politician) (born 1950), Alaska State Senate
- Samuel Phillips Jr. (1752–1802), Massachusetts State Senate
- Stephen C. Phillips (1801–1857), Massachusetts State Senate
- William Phillips Sr. (1722–1804), Massachusetts State Senate

== See also ==
- Kristin Phillips-Hill (fl. 2010s), Pennsylvania State Senate
- Senator Philip (disambiguation)
