= William Phillips Sr. =

American politician

William Phillips Sr. (1722–1804) was a Boston merchant, politician, and a major benefactor of Phillips Academy in Andover, Massachusetts, United States.

== Biography ==
Phillips was a son of Samuel Phillips, pastor of the South Church in Andover, and was a descendant of George Phillips of Watertown, the progenitor of the New England Phillips family in America.

Unlike his brothers, Phillips did not attend Harvard College, instead embarking on a career in the merchant trade, working in the warehouse of merchant Edward Bromfield. He eventually became Bromfield's business partner and married his daughter Abigail in 1744.

In the 1760s Phillips became active in Boston politics, serving as a town selectman starting in 1767. He served on committees established to organize opposition to unpopular British policies, including one to organize agreement to and enforcement of a ban on the importation of goods from Britain subject to taxes imposed by the Townshend Acts. He was also on a committee headed by Samuel Adams and John Hancock to deal with the aftermath of the Boston Massacre in 1770. In 1772, he was elected to the provincial assembly along with Adams, Hancock, and Thomas Cushing. Governor Thomas Gage rejected his election to the governor's council in 1774. That same year, he sat on a committee established to determine who would need assistance when the Port of Boston was closed by Gage's implementation of the Boston Port Act.

When the American Revolutionary War broke out in 1775, Phillips relocated his family from occupied Boston to Norwich, Connecticut, where they lived in the childhood home of Benedict Arnold. He sat on the 1779-1780 convention that drafted the Massachusetts State Constitution and in the state convention that ratified the United States Constitution. He then served as a state representative and senator during the 1780s.

He became interested in the project of an academy at Andover as outlined by his nephew Samuel Phillips. He and his brother Samuel contributed equal amounts to the new academy. He succeeded his brother as president of its board of trustees but only served a few years before age and infirmity forced him to retire.

He was father to William Phillips Jr., father-in-law to Josiah Quincy II, who married his daughter, Abigail Phillips, and grandfather to Josiah Quincy III. He was also the great-grandfather of Samuel H. Walley.

== Notes and references ==
- "William Phillips and William Phillips", New England Historical and Genealogical Register
