= George Phillips (Watertown) =

English clergyman and colonist in America (d. 1644)

The Reverend George Phillips
- Born: c. 1593; Raynham, Norfolk
- Died: July 1, 1644; Watertown, Massachusetts Bay Colony
- Education: Gonville and Caius College, Cambridge (BA, MA)

George Phillips (c. 1593 – July 1, 1644) was an English-born Puritan minister who led, along with Richard Saltonstall, a group of English settlers up the Charles River to settle in what is now Watertown, Massachusetts, in 1630.

A Puritan who was part of the Great Migration from England to New England, Phillips was a contemporary of, and often shared differing views with, John Winthrop. He established the first Congregational Church in Watertown and was one of the early influencers of the Congregational Church in North America. His descendants number in the thousands and are well represented in American history in the clergy, local and national politics, business, and social justice arenas.

== Early life ==
Phillips was born in Raynham, Norfolk. He earned a B.A. from Gonville and Caius College of the University of Cambridge in 1613, and subsequently earned an M.A. degree in 1617. There he was a classmate of John Allin. By 1630 Phillips was the village vicar of Boxted, Essex and was increasingly dissatisfied, as were many Puritans, with the continuance of Roman Catholic ritual and insufficient Calvinist influences on the Church of England. He and many of his parishioners chose to leave England and head for America.

Phillips joined John Winthrop on the Winthrop Fleet to emigrate to America on the Arbella, whose passengers included Winthrop and his family, Anne Bradstreet, Captain John Underhill, Thomas Dudley, and Richard Saltonstall. The ship left England on April 20, 1630, and arrived in Salem on June 12.

== Founding of Watertown and First Congregational Church ==
Phillips arrived with Saltonstall at what is now known as Gerry's Landing in what was initially known as the Saltonstall Plantation, in the summer of 1630. He called the first church together in July, and in late August he had 30 acres along the Charles River.

It is claimed that Phillips was the author of the Watertown Covenant signed by the founders of the town, which not only served as an organizing document but also as a declaration of a bill of rights whose authority comes from "God":

"We ... have undertaken (for the promoting of His glory, and the Church's good, and the honour of our blessed Jesus...) a long and hazardous voyage from… Old England in Europe, to New England in America; that we may walk before Him, and serve Him without fear, in holiness and righteousness, all the days of our lives ... and enter into a sure covenant with the Lord our God, and before Him, with one another, by oath... to renounce all idolatry and superstition, will-worship, all human traditions and inventions whatsoever in the worship of God; and forsaking all evil ways, do give ourselves wholly unto the Lord Jesus, to do Him faithful service, observing and keeping all His statutes, commands, and ordinances, in all matters concerning our reformation, His worship, administrations, ministry, and government, and in the carriage for ourselves among ourselves and one towards another, as He hath prescribed in His holy Word.Further swearing to cleave unto that [the Word of God] alone, and the true sense and meaning thereof to the utmost of our power, as unto the most clear light, and infallible rule, and all-sufficient canon in all things that concern us in this our way.

While Phillips was a Puritan, he expressed a greater tolerance and acceptance for differing Protestant thought. While critical of the Church of England, he was not an advocate of full separation. In fact, he signed a document entitled The Humble Request on the Arbella, explicitly denouncing a desire for separation. He was a supporter of Infant baptism and was tolerant of Baptist religious views, much to the consternation of John Winthrop. Phillips drafted signed and filed with the State House a petition to pardon a man who had been fined for possessing a Baptist tract. Arguably Phillips, in deviating from the strictness of Winthrop on the other side of the Charles in Boston, helped to lay the groundwork for the more inclusive spirit of today's Congregational churches. Cotton Mather once said of Phillips that he was "better acquainted with the true congregational church-discipline than most of the ministers who came with him to this country."

Phillips served on the committee of the Massachusetts General Court in the formulation of what became called the Body of Liberties issues in 1641. In 1642 Phillips was appointed to the Board of Overseers of the newly formed Harvard College in Cambridge.

== Family ==
Phillips had children by two wives. His first wife died soon after arriving in New England. Their children were Samuel and Elizabeth. By his second wife, Elizabeth, Phillips had the following children: Zerobabel, Jonathan, and Theophilus.

He was likely related to Henry Phillips, his brother Nicholas, and Martin Phillips, all of Dedham, Massachusetts.

Phillips died in Watertown on July 1, 1644, and was buried the subsequent day in what is now called the Arlington Street Cemetery. Upon his death John Winthrop wrote "He was...a Godly man, specially gifted, and very peaceful in his place, much lamented of his own people and others."

== Descendants ==
Phillips's descendants became prominent members of Boston life and are considered part of what were known as the Boston Brahmins. They include New England and national leaders in religion, academia, government, business and social justice. They include:

- Samuel Phillips (1690-1771), first pastor of the South Church in Andover, Massachusetts
- John Phillips (1719-1795), founder of Phillips Exeter Academy.
- Major Moses Phillips (1742-1818), partnered with his father-in-law Henry Wisner in Walkill, New York, to manufacture gunpowder for George Washington.
- Samuel Phillips Jr. (1752-1802), founder of Phillips Academy at Andover, member of the Massachusetts Provincial Congress, and former Lieutenant Governor of Massachusetts.
- John Phillips (1770-1823), former Mayor of Boston.
- Josiah Quincy III (1772-1864), former mayor of Boston, US Congressman, and President of Harvard University.
- Elihu Lyman Phillips (1800-1884) businessman and politician in New York and Wisconsin, one of the original incorporators of the Union Pacific Rail Road.
- Wendell Phillips (1811-1884), leading 19th-century abolitionist and orator.
- Samuel Curtis Johnson Sr. (1833-1919), founder of SC Johnson
- Phillips Brooks (1835-1893): American Episcopal clergyman and author.
- Mary Amanda née Outwater White (1836-1887) advocate for higher education, wife of Andrew Dickson White, co-founder of Cornell University.
- John Sanborn Phillips (1861-1949), publisher of McClure's Magazine.
- Samuel Phillips Huntington (1927-2008), Harvard political science professor and author.
- Charles F. Brush (1849-1929), engineer, inventor and philanthropist.
- Bill Gates (1955-), billionaire software pioneer (founder of Microsoft) and philanthropist.
- Nick Sheedy (1974- ), professional genealogist and former Lead Genealogist for the popular PBS television show Finding Your Roots – with Henry Louis Gates, Jr.

== Legacy ==
In 1855 a group of orthodox Trinitarian Christians founded a new church in Watertown, naming it the Philips Congregational Church in honor of Rev. Phillips. This church later merged with another Congregational Church, Payson Park United Church of Christ. The building is now owned by Redeemer Fellowship Church.

Phillips is specifically mentioned in a 1948 marker at the edge of the Charles River which honors him and Saltonstall at what is called Sir Richard's Landing. The text on the monument is as follows:

Here Reverend George Phillips protest in 1632 against taxation without representation struck the first note of civil liberty heard in this wilderness.

Phillips also appears prominently on the Watertown Founders Monument.

A Phillips Street in Watertown is likely named after him.

The Phillips name appears prominently in academia with Phillips Andover and Phillips Exeter prepatoratory schools, as well as the Phillips Brooks House Association at Harvard.
