= John Stevens (architect) =

- Born: 1824
- Died: April 14, 1881 (aged 56–57); Worcester, Massachusetts
- Occupation: Architect
- Practice: John Stevens; John Stevens & Son

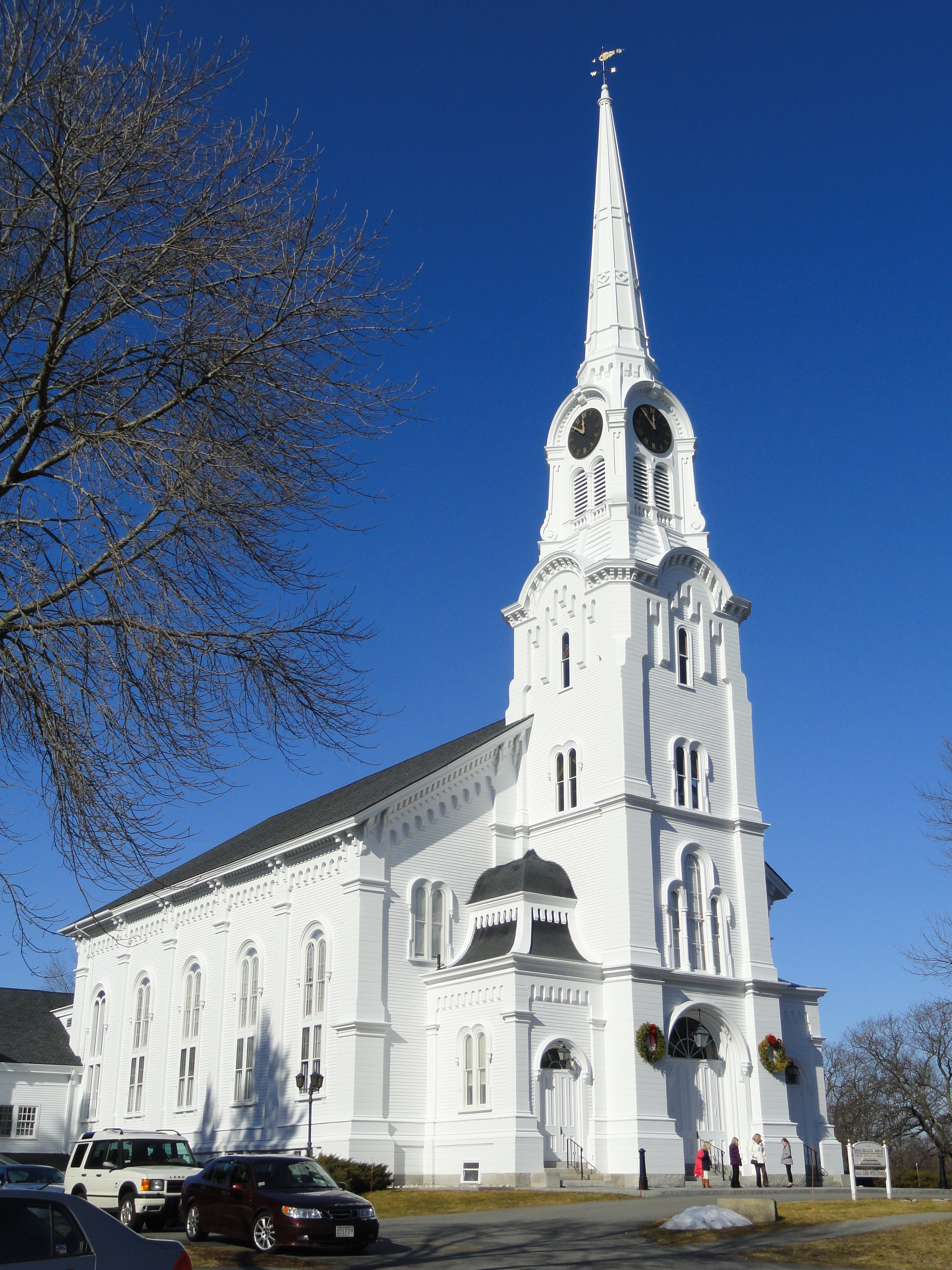
South Church, Andover. 1860.

John Stevens (1824–1881) was an American architect who practiced in Boston, Massachusetts. He was known for ecclesiastical design, and designed churches and other buildings across New England.

== Life and career ==
John Stevens was born in 1824. His early life is unknown, and he established himself as an architect in Boston in 1850. After several years primarily designing schools and private residences, he began receiving commissions for churches by the end of the 1850s. He built these churches, generally in the Romanesque Revival style, in Massachusetts, Maine, Vermont, and Rhode Island. From 1860 to 1862 he employed Archimedes Russell, who would later become a prominent architect in Syracuse, New York. In 1869 he was briefly associated with S. F. Pratt, at which time he was working on buildings at Oak Bluffs. He remained in Massachusetts until 1879, when he established a partnership with his son, J. Walter Stevens, and moved west to St. Paul, Minnesota. John Stevens & Son operated until April 14, 1881, when Stevens died while on a visit to Worcester, Massachusetts.

== Legacy ==
Stevens designed a great many churches. His Baptist church in Saint John, New Brunswick, completed in 1878, was said to have been his 113th. Many of his churches were built on only three basic models, which he relied on throughout his career. His contemporaries criticized him for this repetitiveness. In 1878, an anonymous writer going by "Verax" wrote in regard to his St. John church: "and as the 'outline and general features are after the Byzantine period' we may expect something similar to Mr. Stevens's previous works, which may be seen in almost every city from Calais to Lynn."

At least six of his works have been listed individually on the National Register of Historic Places, and several more contribute to listed historic districts.

== Architectural works ==
Year	Building	Address	City	State	Notes	Image	Reference
1852	Nathaniel Dearborn House	21 Chestnut St	Wakefield	Massachusetts	On the National Register of Historic Places.		
1854	Smith Hall	Abbot Academy	Andover	Massachusetts	Demolished.		
c. 1855	Stephen Hall House	64 Minot St	Reading	Massachusetts	On the National Register of Historic Places.		
1855	Punchard Free School	36 Bartlett St	Andover	Massachusetts	Demolished.		
1857	Malden Town Hall	389 Main St	Malden	Massachusetts	Demolished.		
1859	First Congregational Church	322 Main St	Woburn	Massachusetts	On the National Register of Historic Places.		
1859	First Parish Congregational Church	1 Church St	Wakefield	Massachusetts	A complete rebuilding. Demolished in 1890.		
1859	North Church	240 Main St	Haverhill	Massachusetts			
1860	First Congregational Church	1 S Main St	Randolph	Massachusetts	Burned in 1936.		
1860	Reading Agricultural and Mechanical Association Building	643 Main St	Reading	Massachusetts	Built with an elaborate mansard roof, removed in 1959.		
1860	South Church	41 Central St	Andover	Massachusetts			
1861	Haverhill City Hall	Main St	Haverhill	Massachusetts	Demolished.		
1861	Cyrus Wakefield House	467 Main St	Wakefield	Massachusetts	Demolished.		
1863	First Parish Congregational Church	12 Beach St	Saco	Maine	Burned in 2000. Previously on the National Register of Historic Places.		
1863	Third (Pavilion) Congregational Church	270 Main St	Biddeford	Maine	Converted into the McArthur Public Library.		
1864	First Baptist Church	81 St Paul St	Burlington	Vermont	On the National Register of Historic Places.		
1865	Trinitarian Congregational Church	72 Elm St	North Andover	Massachusetts			
1866	Oren B. Cheney House	262 College St	Lewiston	Maine	Now Cheney House of Bates College.		
1866	Masonic Temple	326 Main St	Melrose	Massachusetts	Heavily altered.		
1866	Pine Street Congregational Church	60 Pine St	Lewiston	Maine	Demolished.		
1867	Erastus P. Carpenter House	47 Ocean Ave	Oak Bluffs	Massachusetts			
1867	First Congregational Church	1 Washburn Sq	Leicester	Massachusetts	Burned in 1900.		
1867	Pawtucket Congregational Church	40 Walcott St	Pawtucket	Rhode Island	On the National Register of Historic Places.		
1868	Memorial Hall	22 South St	Foxborough	Massachusetts	On the National Register of Historic Places.		
1868	Wakefield Town Hall	Main and Water Sts	Wakefield	Massachusetts	Demolished in 1958.		
1870	Court Street Baptist Church	129 Court St	Auburn	Maine			
1871	First Congregational Church	171 Main St	Franklin	Massachusetts	Demolished or burned.		
1871	First Congregational Church	150 S Common St	Lynn	Massachusetts			
1871	Wakefield High School	1 Lafayette St	Wakefield	Massachusetts	Now the Town Hall.		
1873	First Congregational Church	21 Calais Ave	Calais	Maine	Burned in 1992.		
1874	Melrose Town Hall	562 Main St	Melrose	Massachusetts	Substantially burned in 1937, and rebuilt from designs by Mowll & Rand.		
1876	First Universalist Church	169 Pleasant St	Auburn	Maine	On the National Register of Historic Places.		
1877	Weldon (King Edward) School	210 Wentworth St	St. John	New Brunswick	Demolished.		
1878	Central Baptist Church	42 Leinster St	St. John	New Brunswick	Said to be his 113th church.		
