= First Baptist Church (Burlington, Vermont) =

Historic church in Vermont, United States

- U.S. National Register of Historic Places
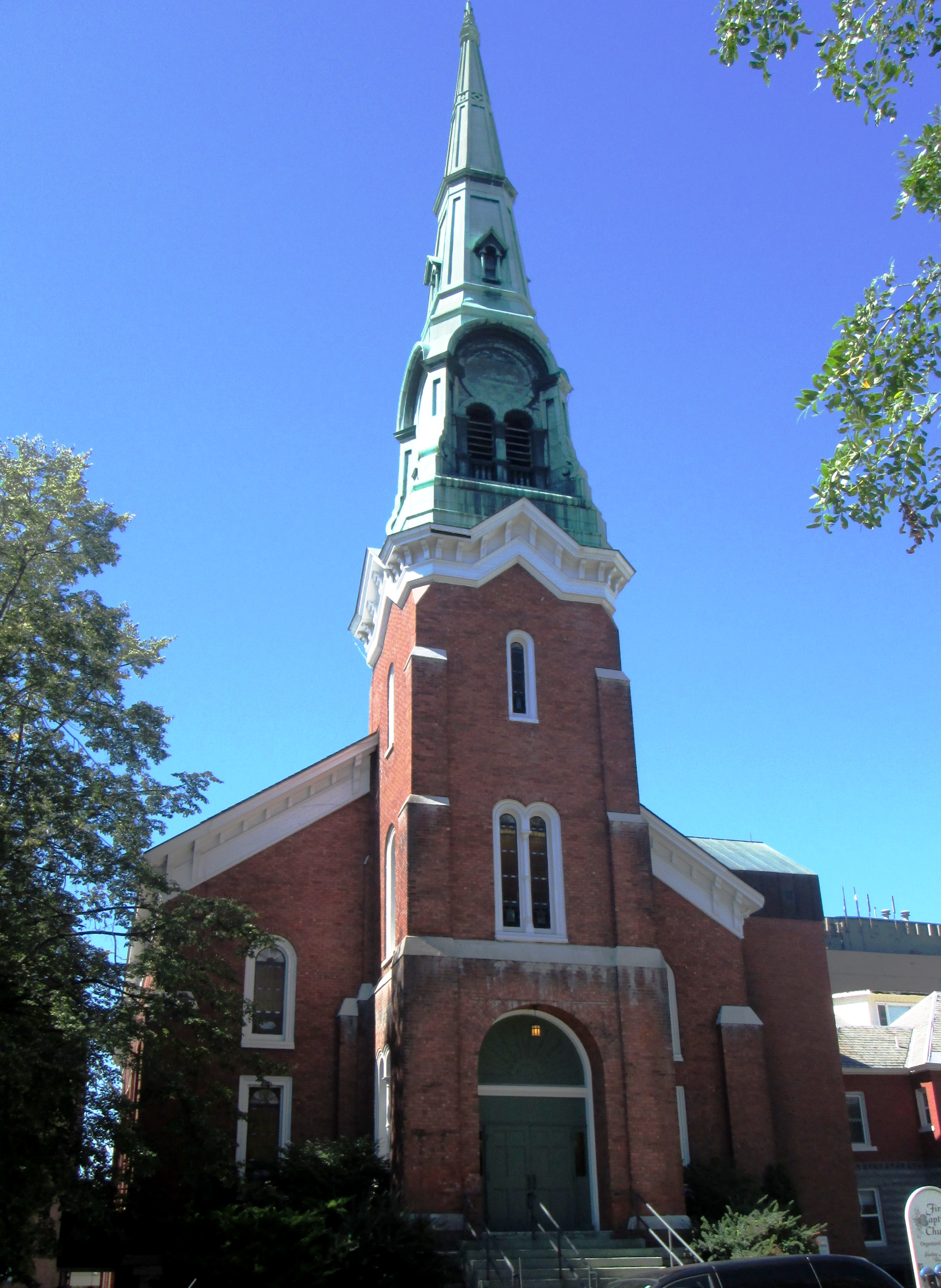
- 2013 photo

- Location within Vermont Location within the United States
- Location: 81 St. Paul St. Burlington, Vermont
- Coordinates: 44°28′40″N 73°12′52″W
- Built: 1864
- Built by: Thomas Hill
- Architect: John Stevens
- Architectural style: Italianate
- MPS: Religious Buildings, Sites and Structures in Vermont MPS
- NRHP reference No.: 01000217
- Added to NRHP: March 2, 2001

The First Baptist Church is a historic church located at 81 St. Paul Street in Burlington, Vermont. Built in 1864, it is a significant example of early Italianate ecclesiastical architecture in the state. It was designed by Boston architect John Stevens. The church was added to the National Register of Historic Places in 2001.

== Architecture and history ==
The First Baptist Church is located in central Burlington, on the west side of St. Paul Street south of Bank Street. It is a rectangular two-story structure, with a timber frame and red brick exterior built on a red stone foundation. A three-story tower projects from the center of the front facade, topped by a distinctive multistage copper-clad steeple. The building's Italianate features include brackets in the gable and eaves, and round-headed windows on the second level. The front building corners and the tower have shallow buttresses. The interior is reflective of later alterations, and is less ornate than when it was originally built.

The Baptist Society of Burlington was organized in 1830, the first Baptist services having been held in the city in 1822. They first met in rented space, before building their own edifice at Main and Church Streets in 1845. Having outgrown that space, they commissioned Thomas Hill of Saco, Maine to build a larger building for them. Finding issues with the new design, he recommended John Stevens of Boston, who produced the design for the present building. It was dedicated on December 15, 1864.

== See also ==
- National Register of Historic Places listings in Chittenden County, Vermont
