= House at 21 Chestnut Street =

Historic house in Massachusetts, United States

- U.S. National Register of Historic Places
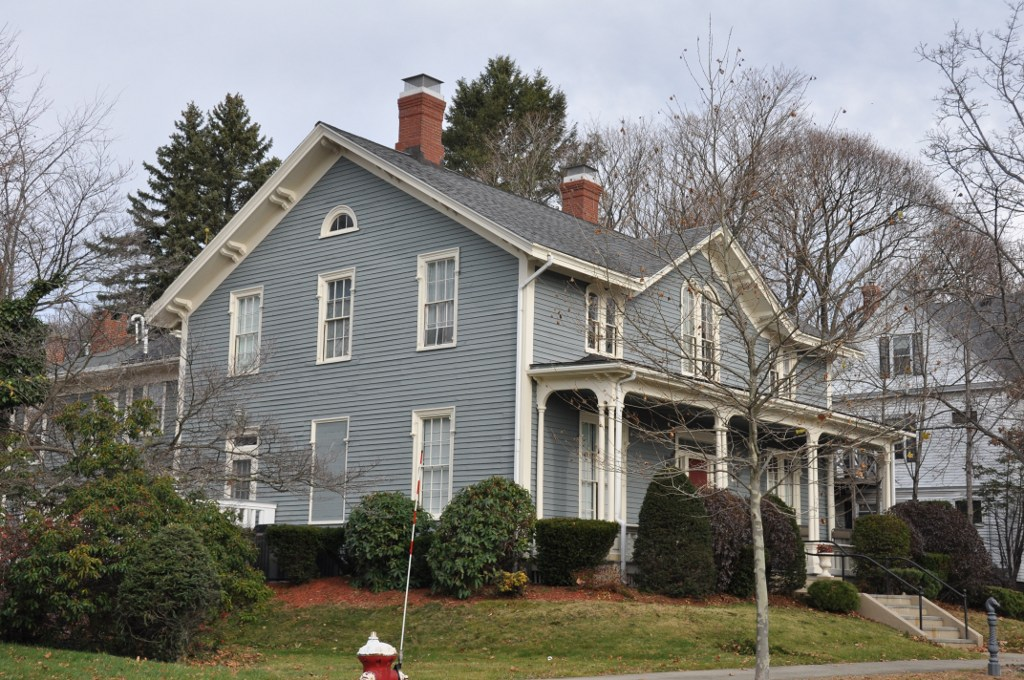

- Location within Massachusetts Location within the United States
- Location: 21 Chestnut St., Wakefield, Massachusetts
- Coordinates: 42°30′12″N 71°4′29″W
- Built: 1850
- Architect: John Stevens
- Architectural style: Italianate
- MPS: Wakefield MRA
- NRHP reference No.: 89000727
- Added to NRHP: July 06, 1989

The House at 21 Chestnut Street is one of the best preserved Italianate houses in Wakefield, Massachusetts. It was built c. 1855 to a design by local architect John Stevens, and was home for many years to local historian Ruth Woodbury. The house was listed on the National Register of Historic Places in 1989.

== Description and history ==
The house is set on the north side of Chestnut Street, a residential street running east–west between North Avenue and Main Street, the town's major commercial thoroughfares. It is a 2 1/2-story wood-frame structure, with a side-gable roof and clapboard siding. The main facade is three bays wide, with a gable above the central gable, making room for a round-arch two-part window. A single-story hip-roofed porch extends across the front facade, supported by paired columns. The porch roof and main roof both sport paired brackets.

The house was built about 1850, not long after Chestnut Street was laid out (1847). It is one of a series of Italianate houses on the street, and was designed by John Stevens, one of the few architects known to be working in Wakefield in the 19th century. Prominent residents of the house include Nathaniel Dearborn, a Boston printer active in the local militia and as a trustee of Lakeview Cemetery, and Ruth Woodbury, one of the town's best-known historians.

== See also ==
- National Register of Historic Places listings in Wakefield, Massachusetts
- National Register of Historic Places listings in Middlesex County, Massachusetts
