= Stephen Hall House =

Historic house in Massachusetts, United States

- U.S. National Register of Historic Places
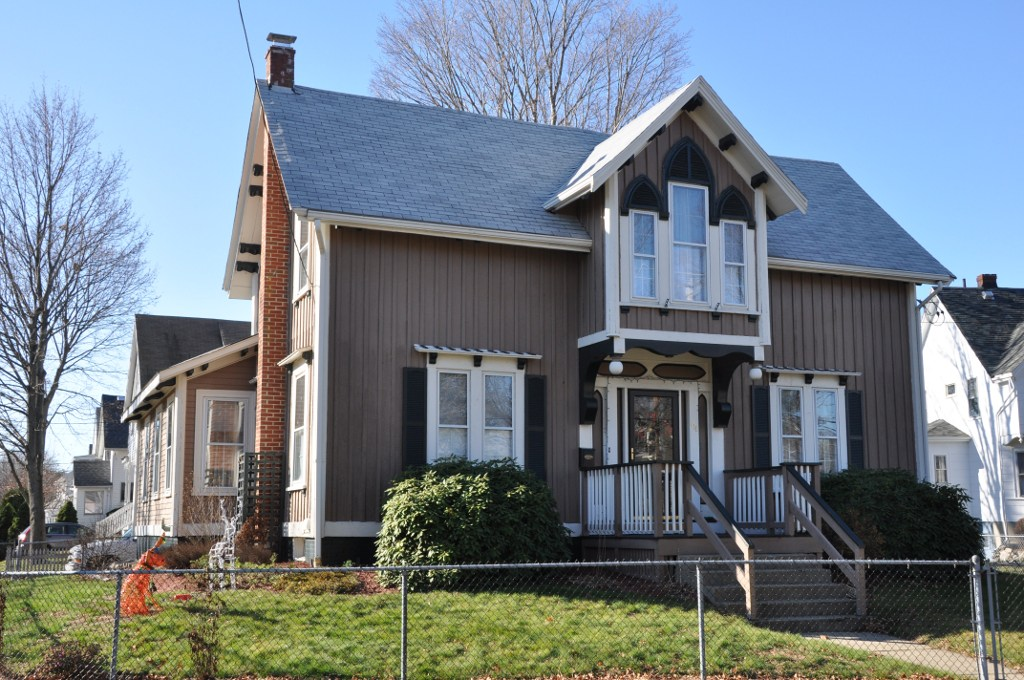

- Location within Massachusetts Location within the United States
- Location: 64 Minot Street; Reading, Massachusetts
- Coordinates: 42°31′11.84″N 71°6′20.08″W
- Built: 1855
- Architect: John Stevens
- Architectural style: Gothic Revival
- MPS: Reading MRA
- NRHP reference No.: 84002630
- Added to NRHP: July 19, 1984

The Stephen Hall House is a historic house at 64 Minot Street in Reading, Massachusetts. The 1 1/2-story wood-frame house was built in the 1850s, and is one of Reading's best examples of Gothic Victorian residential architecture. It has board-and-batten siding, long and narrow windows, and a central projecting gabled overhang with Gothic arched windows and a deep eave with brackets. Although it appears to be a near copy of a design published by Andrew Jackson Downing, its plan was apparently copied from a house in Wakefield, and is lacking some of Downing's proportions.

The house was listed on the National Register of Historic Places in 1984.

== See also ==
- National Register of Historic Places listings in Reading, Massachusetts
- National Register of Historic Places listings in Middlesex County, Massachusetts
