= First Universalist Church (Auburn, Maine) =

Historic church in Maine, United States

- U.S. National Register of Historic Places
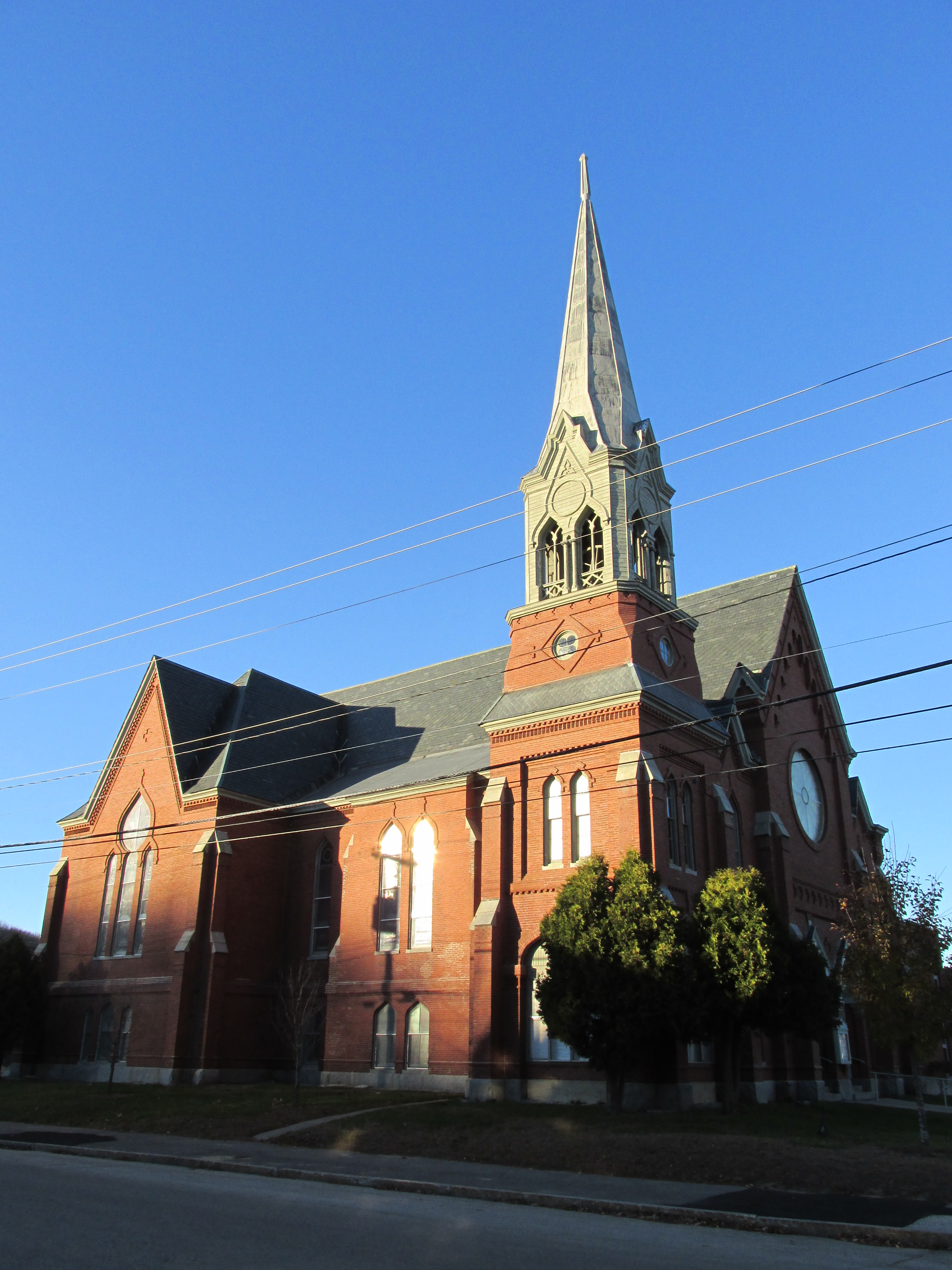
- First Universalist Church

- Location within Maine Location within the United States
- Location: Auburn, Maine
- Coordinates: 44°5′39″N 70°13′46″W
- Built: 1876
- Architect: John Stevens
- Architectural style: Gothic Revival
- NRHP reference No.: 79000126
- Added to NRHP: May 7, 1979

The First Universalist Church is a historic church building on the corner of Pleasant, Elm, and Spring Streets in Auburn, Maine. It was built in 1876 to a design by John Stevens of Boston, Massachusetts, and has been a significant landmark in the city since its construction. It is a fine local example of Gothic Revival architecture executed in brick, and was listed on the National Register of Historic Places in 1979.

== Description and history ==
The First Universalist Church occupies a lot southwest of the city's downtown business district. It is a large brick Gothic Revival structure, with a polychrome slate roof, with walls trimmed in stone and wood. The sides and corners of the building are buttressed. Its main facade is oriented eastward toward Pleasant Street, and has a three-stage tower attached to the southern edge. The tower has large Gothic windows in the first level, paired lancet windows in the second, and quatrefoils in the third. The belfry above has paired lancet-arched louvered openings, with an octagonal spire above. There are two main entrances, recessed in Gothic openings in the front facade, with a large rose window above. Each of the long sides has a projecting section near the western end, giving the building a cruciform shape.

The church was built in 1876, replacing the congregation's previous building, a wood-frame building on High Street built in 1839. This church was designed by John Stevens of Boston, Massachusetts, and is one of Auburn's finest examples of high-style Gothic Revival architecture.

== See also ==
- National Register of Historic Places listings in Androscoggin County, Maine
