= Senator Philip =

Senator Philip may refer to:

- James "Scotty" Philip (1858–1911), South Dakota State Senate
- James Philip (1930–2023), Illinois State Senate

== See also ==
- Senator Phillips (disambiguation)
