= William Lloyd (Methodist minister) =

William Lloyd (1771 – 10 April 1841) was a Welsh Anglican priest who became a schoolteacher and Methodist preacher.

== Life ==
Lloyd, who was born in 1771, was educated at the grammar school in Botwnnog and at Jesus College, Oxford. In 1801, he was ordained and became curate in Rhoscolyn, Llanfair yn Neubwll, and Llanfihangel, Anglesey. In 1805, his support for the Methodists led to his being deprived of his parish positions, and he thereafter became a schoolmaster in north Wales, firstly near Clynnog Fawr and then, from 1817 onwards, in Caernarfon. He was regarded as a pious man and an influential cleric, although not as a great preacher. He died on 10 April 1841 and was buried in Llanbeblig near Caernarfon.
