= South Church, Andover, Massachusetts =

South Church
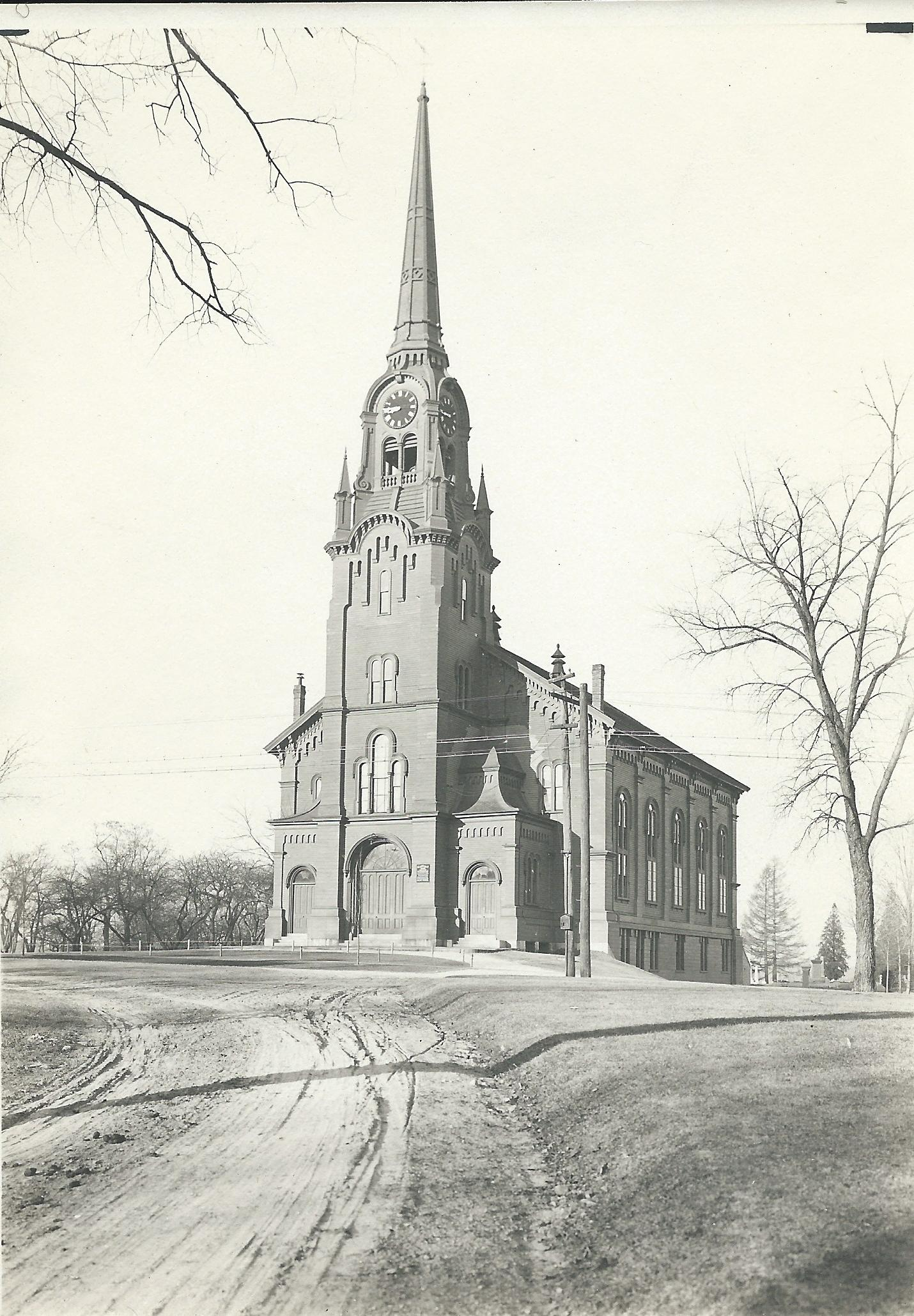
- Photograph of the South Church c. 1920
- South Church
- 42°39′11.97″N 71°8′35.28″W
- Location: 41 Central Street; Andover, Massachusetts
- Country: United States
- Denomination: United Church of Christ
- Previous denomination: Congregational
- Website: Official website

History
- Status: Church
- Founded: October 17, 1711; 314 years ago
- Founder(s): General Court of Andover, Massachusetts
- Events: Construction of meeting houses: First: 1709; Second: 1734; Third: 1788; Fourth: 1860

Architecture
- Functional status: Active
- Architect: John Stevens
- Style: Romanesque Revival
- Groundbreaking: 1860
- Completed: January 2, 1861
- Construction cost: $19,000

Specifications
- Capacity: 725
- Length: 109 ft (33 m)
- Width: 71 ft (22 m)

Administration
- Division: United Church of Christ (UCC)

Clergy
- Pastor(s): Reverend Dana Allen Walsh; Reverend Genevieve Hosterman (associate)

The South Church is a Protestant Christian place of worship located in Andover, Massachusetts, US. It was organized as the Second Church of Andover in 1711 with Rev. Samuel Phillips as its first pastor. It is currently part of the United Church of Christ.

== History ==
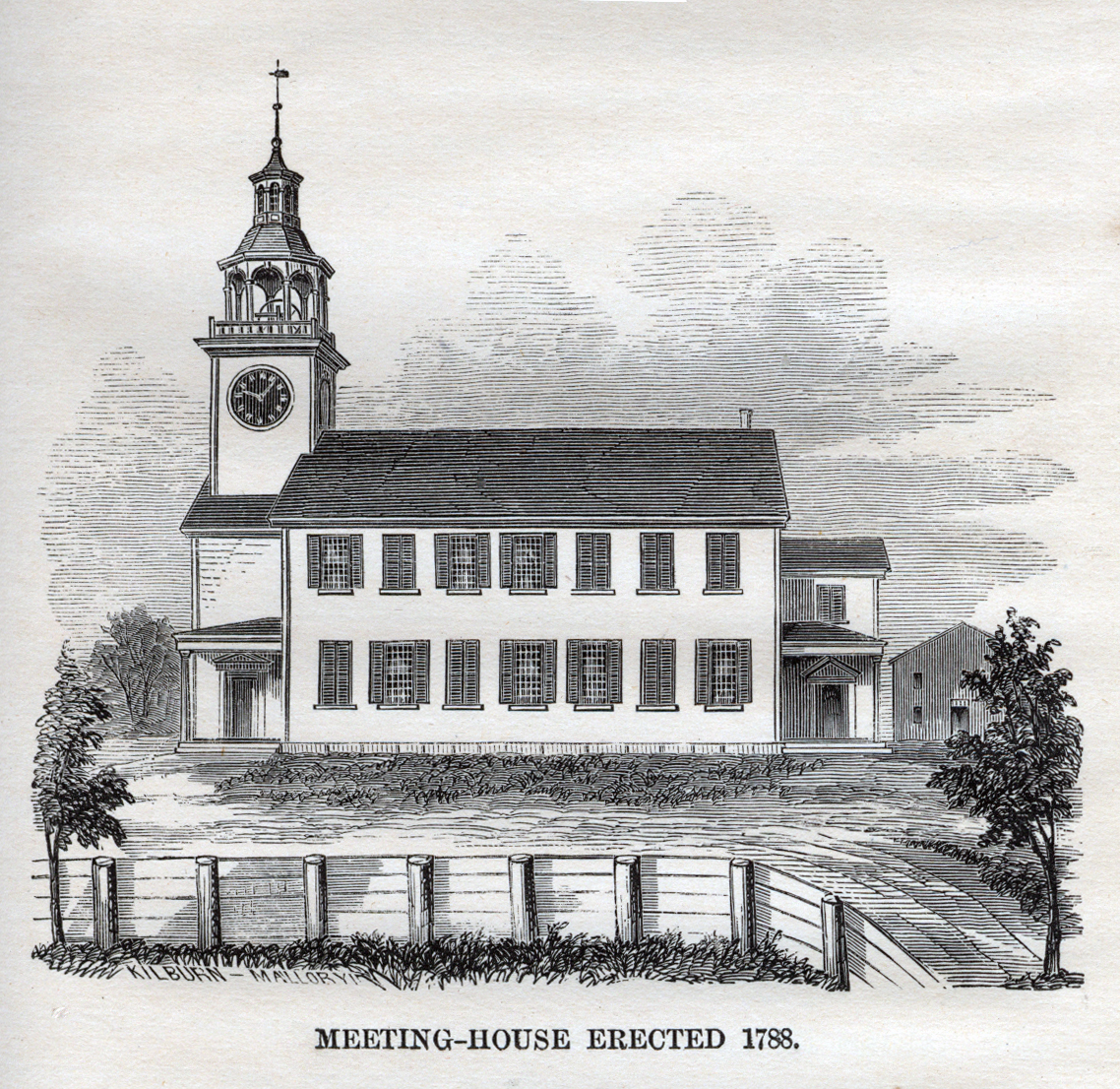
An engraving of the third meeting house built in 1788.

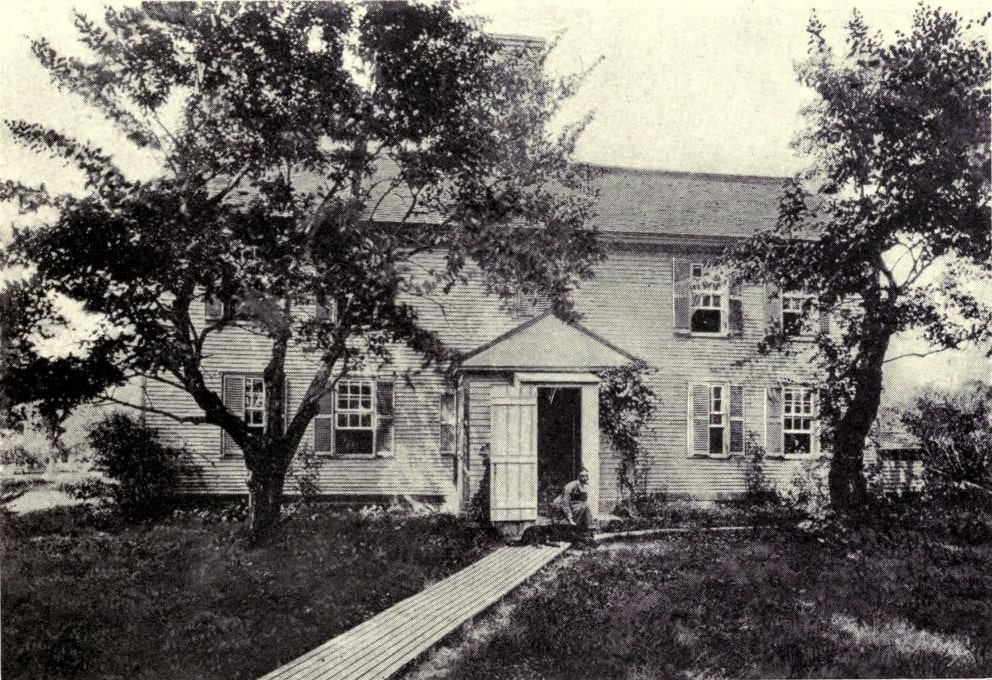
The South Church parsonage

Until the early 18th century, one parish, known as "The Church of Andover" served the entire town. Its church, or meeting house, was located in present day North Andover. When it was found that the majority of the citizens lived in the southern part of the town (present day Andover), the idea was proposed to build a new meeting house there. However, rather than one meeting house serve the entire town, it was agreed upon on November 2, 1708 that the town should have two meeting houses, one in the north and one in the south. The North Parish (present day North Andover) kept the existing meeting house. On October 18, 1709, the location of the new South Church was agreed upon and built "at y^{e} Rock on the west side of Roger brook." The meeting house was in use by January 1710. Roger's Brook, named after a Native American named Roger who lived in Andover in the 17th century, once flowed by the South Church but has since been rerouted. The rock referenced as "y^{e} Rock" was a well known landmark known as Roger's Rock. It was removed in 1844. On October 17, 1711, the South Parish was officially established. There were 35 original members, all but three of whom came from the North Parish.

Rev. Samuel Phillips began preaching at the church on April 30, 1710 but was not officially its pastor until the parish's founding on October 17, 1711. He served for sixty years until his death on June 5, 1771. He was survived by three children, Samuel, John, and William Phillips, all of whom contributed to the founding of Phillips Academy in 1788. The Samuel Phillips listed here should not be confused with Samuel Phillips Jr., his son and primary founder of the school. John Phillips went on to found Phillips Exeter Academy in 1781.

A parsonage was built for the pastor of the church in 1709. Rev. Phillips and Rev. French lived there until it was sold in 1811 after French's death.

Construction of a larger, new building took place in 1734. On last Sabbath of worship in the old meeting house on May 12, 1734, Phillips preached from John 14:31 1.c. "Arise, let us go hence." He preached the first sermon in the new meeting house on May 19.

Again in 1788 another meeting house (pictured above left) was built in a nearby location after receiving complaints of a long walk by members of the parish living west of the Shawsheen River. Despite the complaints, the new meeting house remained east of the river, only about "six to eight rods" (1 rod = 16.5 feet) away from the meeting house of 1734. During construction, the Trustees of Phillips Academy invited the parish to attend mass in their meeting hall up the hill.

On December 5, 1826, the West Parish Church was built for those west of the Shawsheen River under the same Confession of Faith and Covenant. A total of 56 members of the South Church left to join the West Parish Church.

The current structure (pictured above right) was built in 1860 on the same spot as the meeting house of 1788 and dedicated on January 2, 1861. The church, a Romanesque Revival, was designed by John Stevens and cost about $19,000.

== Cemetery ==
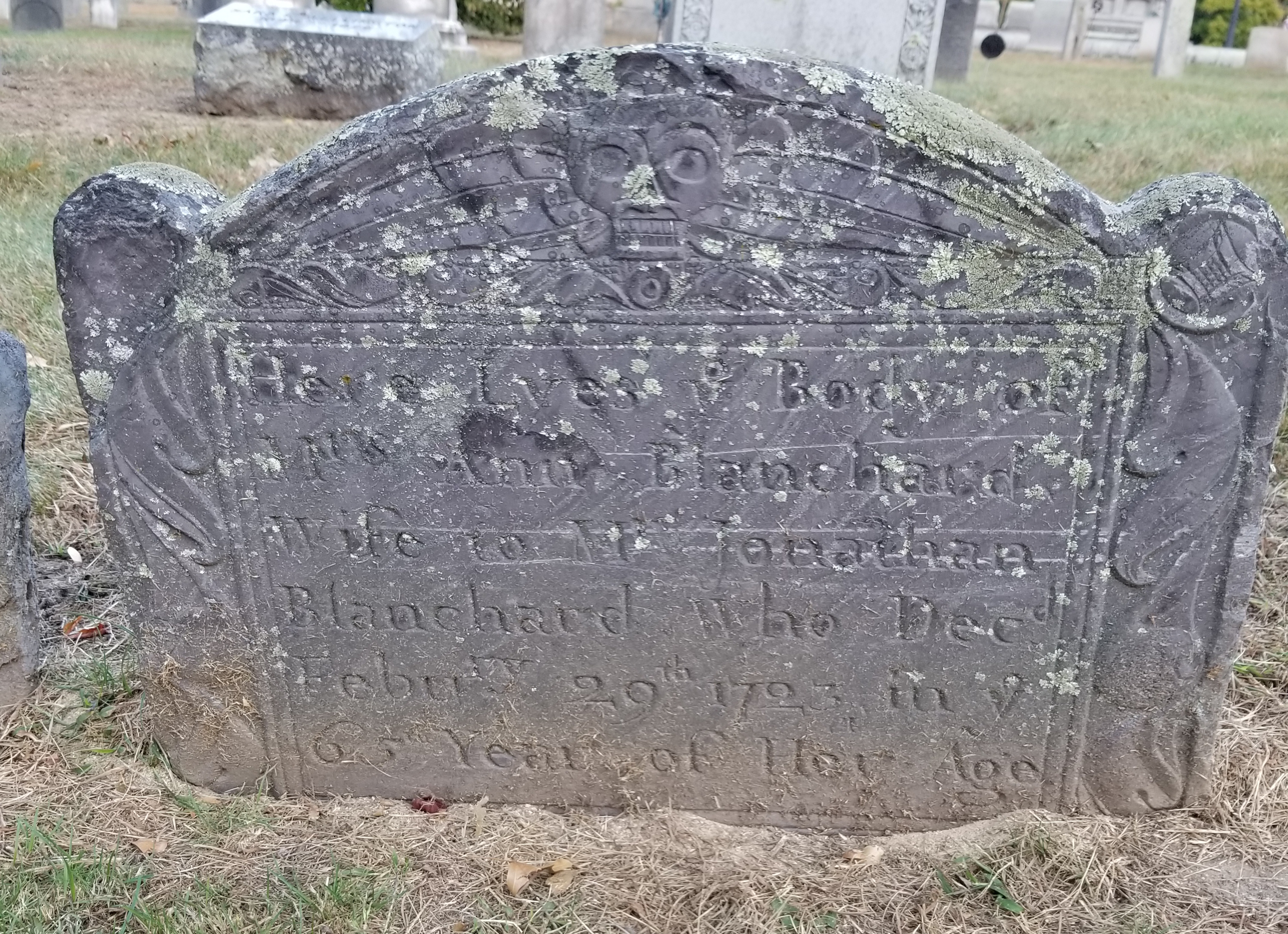
Gravestone of Ann Blanchard, South Church Cemetery, Andover, MA

A cemetery adjacent to the church was established soon after the founding of the parish. The first person to be buried there was Robert Russel in December 1710 however the earliest surviving inscription is on Mrs. Ann Blanchard's stone, who died on February 29, 1723. Over time the cemetery grew through purchasing and receiving land from neighbors.

In the early 18th century it was custom for the bearers to carry the dead, often miles, from their place of death to the cemetery. Funeral sermons were rarely given in the Parish. Reverend Phillips introduced practices that gave bearers white and later purple gloves while carrying the coffin to the grave. For his funeral in 1771, six clergyman wore rings as pallbearers. All ordained ministers in attendance and those who gave gratis in the months leading to his death wore gloves. These practices came to an end during the Revolutionary War. At the time of the second pastor Johnathan French's death in 1809, the Church led the family in their mourning and draped the pulpit in black. In addition, the Church ordered a Day of Fasting and Prayer in his honor. In 1798 the church acquired their first hearse and in 1799 built a hearse house.

== Notable pastors ==
Pastors have included Samuel Phillips (from 1711 to 1771) and L. L. Langstroth (from 1836 to 1839).

== Gallery ==
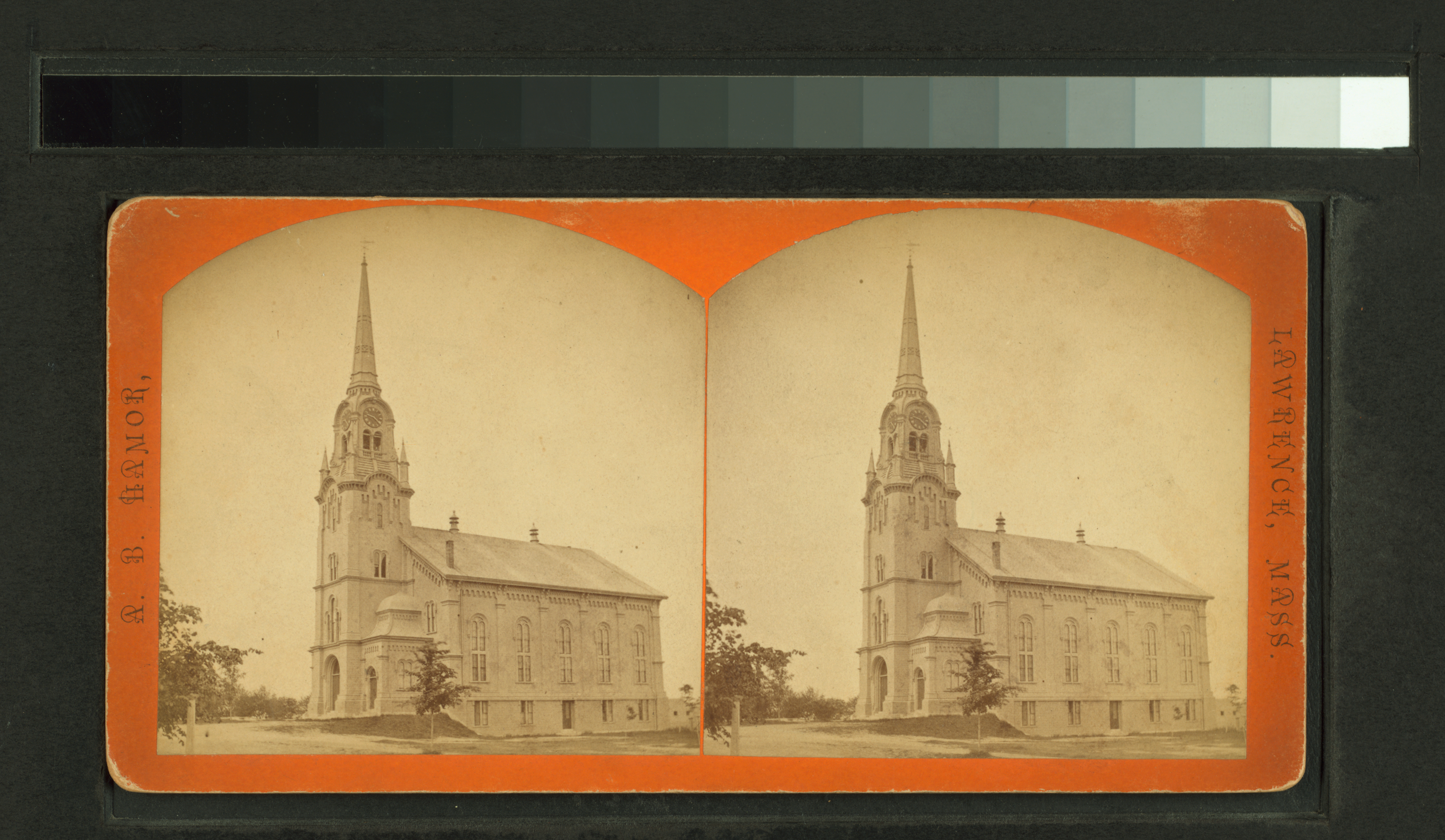
Stereoscopic view of the South Church

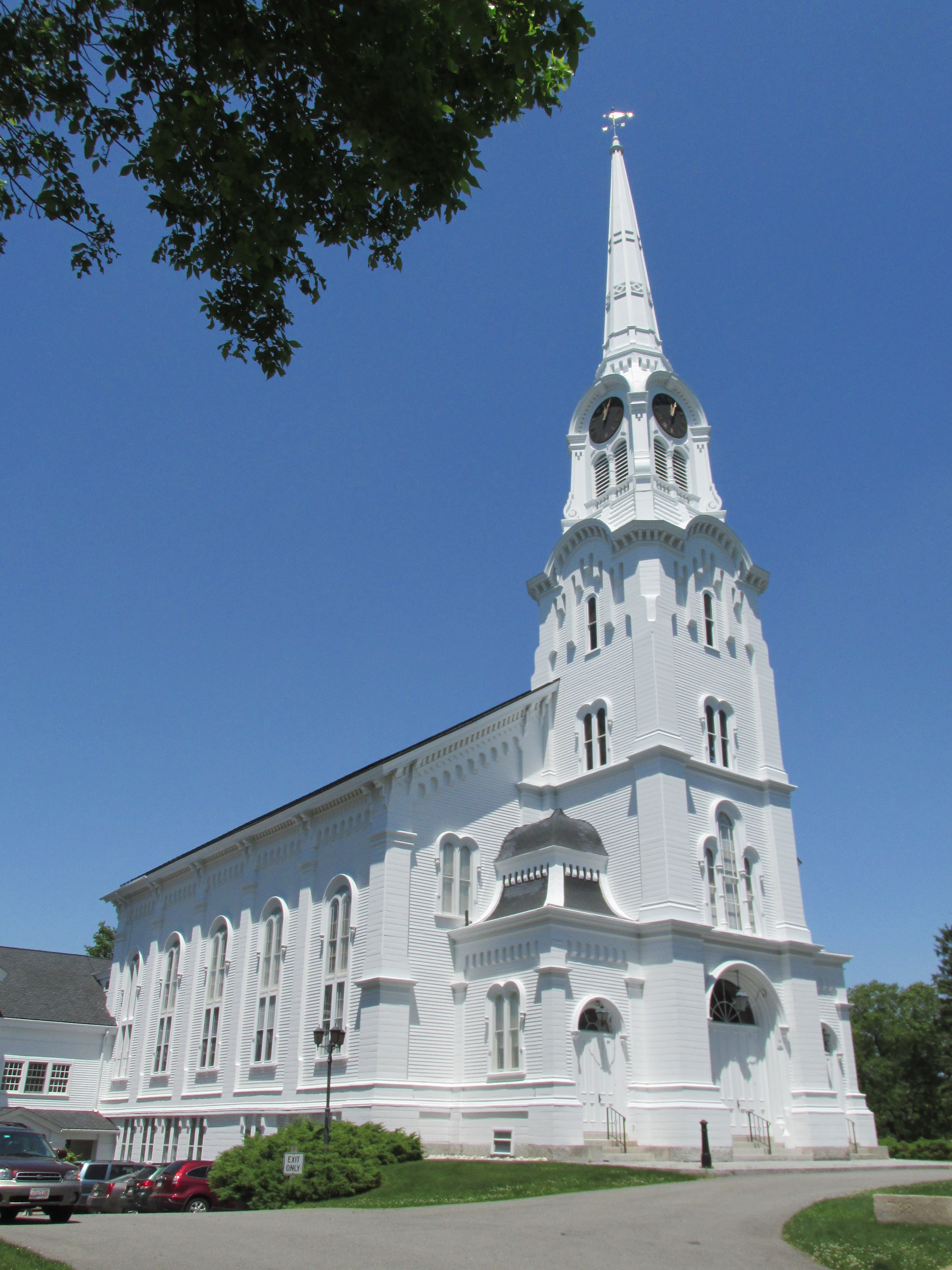
South Church, Andover, Massachusetts

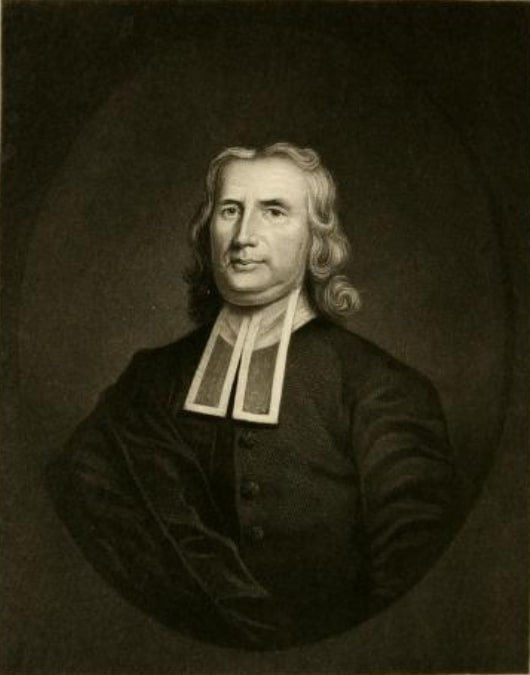
Samuel Phillips, first pastor 1711-1771

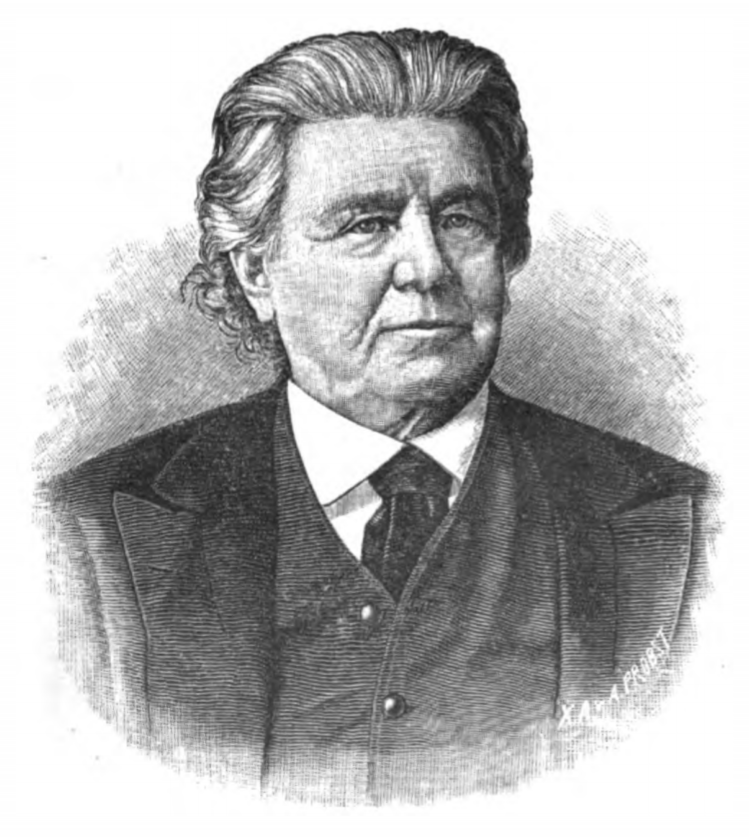
Lorenzo Lorain Langstroth, pastor 1836-1839

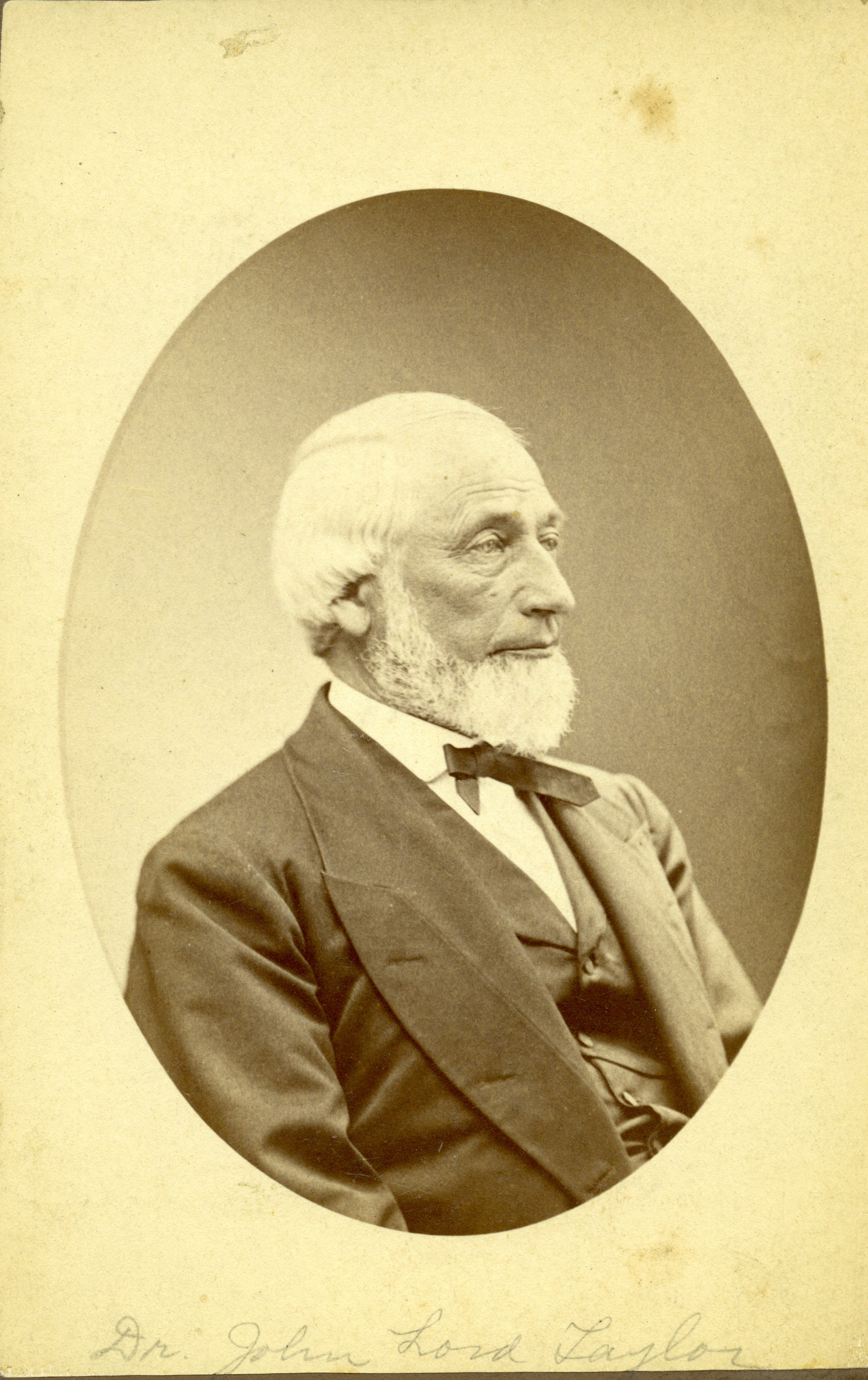
John Lord Taylor, pastor 1839-1852

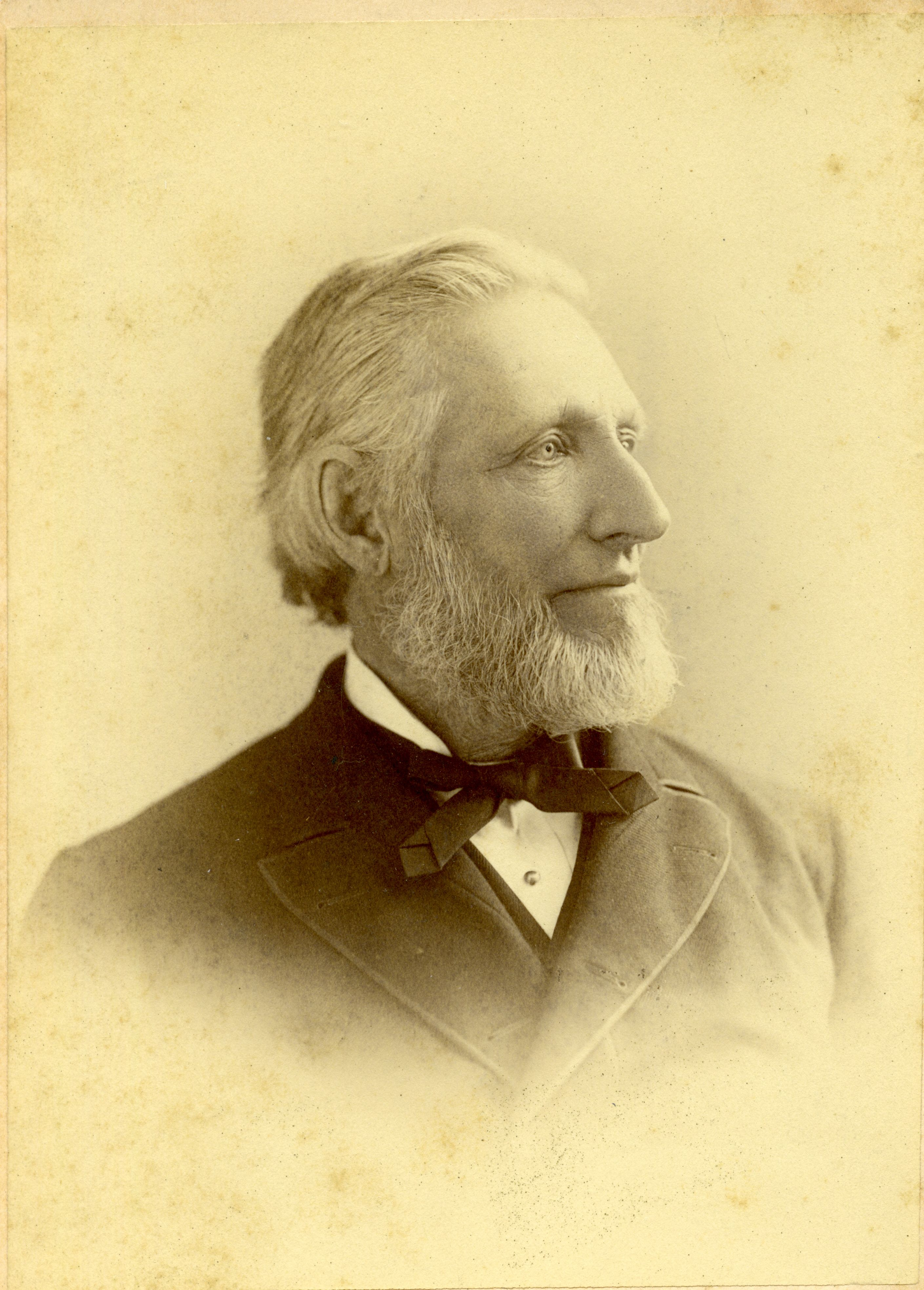
Charles Smith, pastor 1852-1853 and 1861-1876

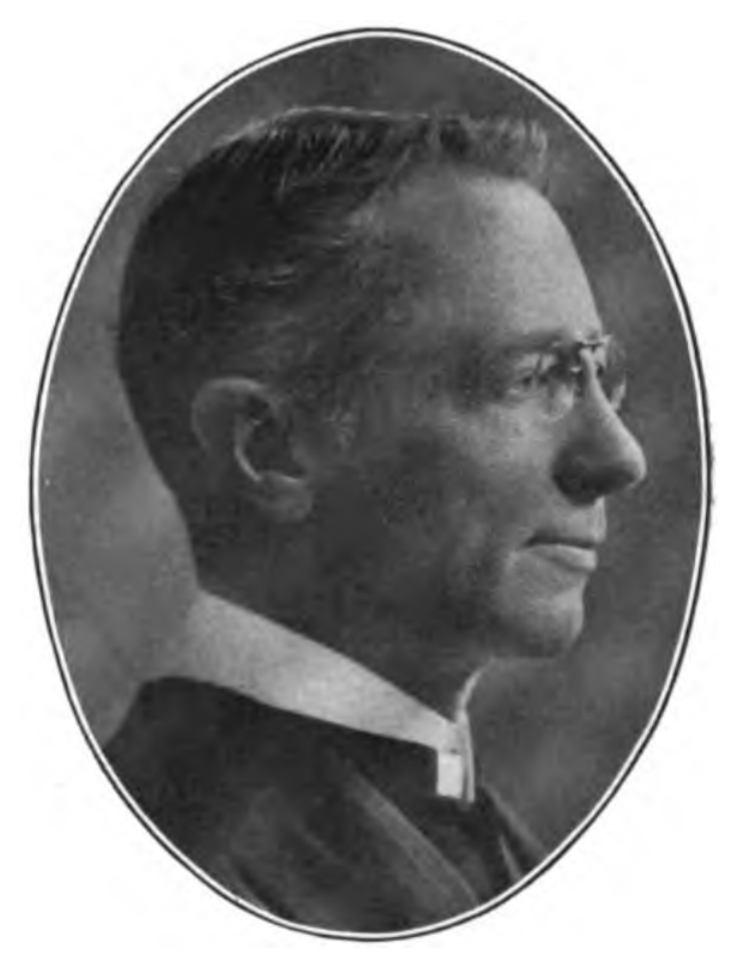
Frank Robinson Shipman, pastor 1893-1914

== See also ==
- Central Street District

== Bibliography ==
- Andover Answers (2006). "South Church (Parish)". Andover Answers. Memorial Hall Library. Archived from the original on 14 September 2023.
- Andover, Massachusetts (1897). Andover, Massachusetts: Proceedings at the Celebration of the Two Hundred and Fiftieth Anniversary of the Incorporation of the Town, May 20, 1896. Andover, MA: The Andover Press.
- Andover Theological Seminary (1908). Carpenter, Charles Carroll (ed.). General Catalogue of the Theological Seminary, Andover, Massachusetts. Boston: Andover Theological Seminary.
- The Andover Townsman (6 November 1931a). "Rev. F. B. Noss Assumes Duties at South Church" (PDF). The Andover Townsman. Andover Press. The Andover Townsman. Archived from the original (PDF) on 14 September 2023.
- The Andover Townsman (6 November 1931b). "A Fine Leader" (PDF). The Andover Townsman. Andover Press. The Andover Townsman. Archived from the original (PDF) on 14 September 2023.
- The Andover Townsman (30 June 1977). "Dr. Bodge Leaving South Church" (PDF). The Andover Townsman. No. 40. Irving E. Rogers. The Andover Townsman. Archived from the original (PDF) on 14 September 2023.
- The Andover Townsman (19 January 1989). "Indiana Minister Named South Church Senior Pastor" (PDF). The Andover Townsman. No. 19. Irving E. Rogers, Jr. Andover Publishing Company. Archived from the original (PDF) on 14 September 2023.
- Andover Townsman Staff (19 April 2018). "Rev. Cal Mutti honored as Pastor Emeritus at South Church". The Andover Townsman. The Andover Townsman. Archived from the original on 14 September 2023.
- Arrington, Benjamin F. (1922). Municipal History of Essex County in Massachusetts. Vol. 1. New York: Lewis Historical Publishing Company.
- Bailey, Sarah (1880). Historical sketches of Andover, (comprising the present towns of North Andover and Andover). Boston: Houghton, Mifflin and Company.
- Betances, Yadira (7 October 2011). "Andover's South Church celebrates 300th year". The Eagle Tribune. The Eagle Tribune. Archived from the original on 14 September 2023.
- Fuess, Claude Moore (1917). An Old New England School: A History of Phillips Academy Andover. Boston: Houghton Mifflin Company.
- General Association of the Congregational Churches of Massachusetts (1882). Minutes of the Eightieth Annual Meeting. Boston: Congregational Publishing Society.
- General Association of the Congregational Churches of Massachusetts (1884). Minutes of the Eighty-Second Annual Meeting. Boston: Congregational Publishing Society.
- General Association of the Congregational Churches of Massachusetts (1893). Minutes of the Ninety-First Annual Meeting. Boston: Congregational Publishing Society.
- General Association of the Congregational Churches of Massachusetts (1894). Minutes of the Ninety-Second Annual Meeting. Boston: Congregational Publishing Society.
- General Association of the Congregational Churches of Massachusetts (1914). Minutes of the One Hundred and Twelfth Annual Meeting. Boston: Congregational Publishing Society.
- General Association of the Congregational Churches of Massachusetts (1928). The Congregational Year-Book. Boston: Congregational Publishing Society.
- Hurd, Duane Hamilton (1888). History of Essex County, Massachusetts: With Biographical Sketches of Many of Its Pioneers and Prominent Men. Vol. 1. Philadelphia: J. W. Lewis & Company. ISBN 9785873700752.
- Langstroth, Lorenzo Lorain (1889). Langstroth on the Hive and Honey Bee. Hamilton, IL: Chas. Dadant & Son.
- Mooar, George (1859). Historical manual of the South church in Andover, Mass. Andover, MA: Warren F. Draper.
- Oberlin College Alumni (June 1916). Martin, Helen White; Stetson, R. H. (eds.). The Oberlin Alumni Magazine. Vol. 12. Oberlin, OH: News Printing Company.
- Princeton University (24 November 1961). Princeton Alumni Weekly. Vol. 62. Princeton, NJ: Princeton University.
- Princeton University (5 March 1968). Princeton Alumni Weekly. Vol. 68. Princeton, NJ: Princeton University.
- Root, Amos Ives; Root, Ernest Rob (1919). The A B C and X Y Z of Bee Culture. Medina, OH: The A. I. Root Company.
- Slater, Virginia (11 May 1967). "The Rev. J. Everett Bodge Accepts Call to Andover". Review Press-Reporter. Bronxville Review Press and Reporter. Bronxville Review Press and Reporter. Archived from the original on 14 September 2023.
- South Church. "Contact Us". South Church. South Church. Archived from the original on 20 December 2018.
- South Church Committee (27 January 2010). "South Church in Andover: Annual Financial Reports for 2009: 299th Annual Meeting" (PDF). South Church. South Church. Archived from the original (PDF) on 21 December 2018.
- South Church Historical Committee (2007). "The South Church In Andover" (PDF). South Church. Archived from the original (PDF) on 27 July 2018.
- United Church of Christ. "Transitions". United Church of Christ Massachusetts Conference. Massachusetts Conference United Church of Christ. p. 5. Archived from the original on 20 December 2018.
- Yale University (1934). Bulletin of Yale University (PDF). New Haven, CT: Yale University.
- Yale University Class of 1885 (1913). Shipman, Frank Robinson (ed.). Quarter-centenary Record of the Class of 1885, Yale University. Boston: Fort Hill Press.
