= John Phillips (educator) =

American politician

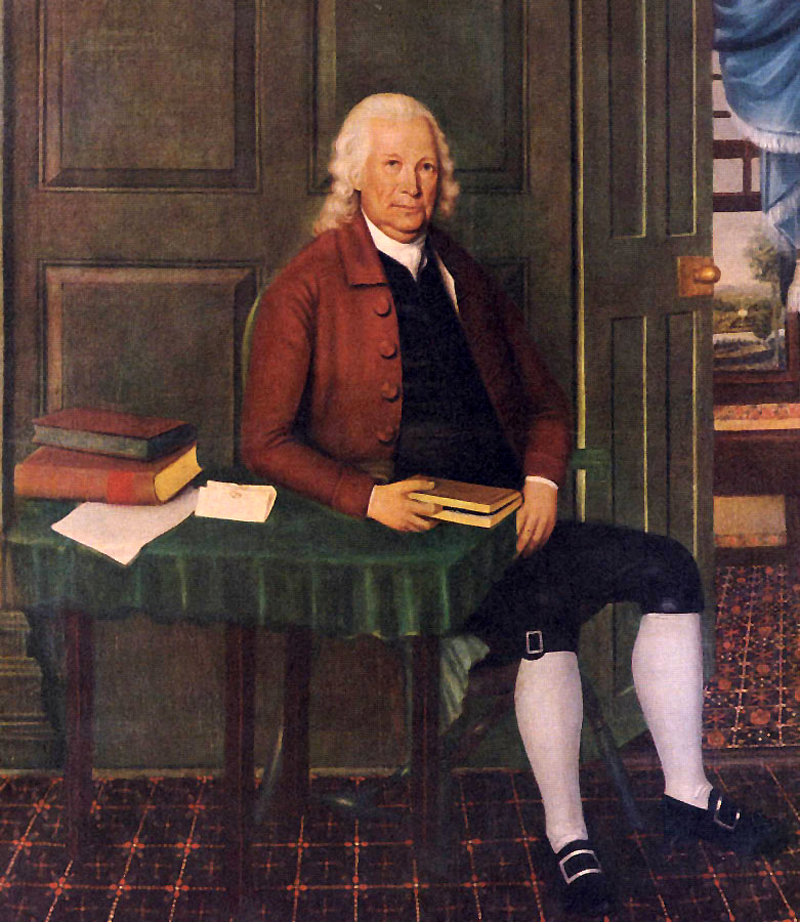
- Born: December 27, 1719; Andover, Massachusetts, British America
- Died: April 21, 1795 (aged 75); Exeter, New Hampshire, U.S.
- Resting place: Exeter Cemetery
- Education: Harvard University
- Known for: Founding Phillips Exeter Academy
- Spouses: Sarah Gilman (m. 1743; died 1765) Elizabeth Hale (m. 1767)
- Children: none
- Parents: Samuel Phillips (father); Hannah White (mother)

John Phillips (December 27, 1719 – April 21, 1795) was an early American educator and the cofounder of Phillips Exeter Academy in New Hampshire, along with his wife, Elizabeth Phillips. He was a major donor to Dartmouth College, where he served as a trustee. He also made significant donations to Harvard College and Princeton University.

== Early life and education ==
Phillips was born on January 7, 1719, to Samuel and Hannah (White) Phillips in Andover, Massachusetts. He was a descendant of the Rev. George Phillips of Watertown, the progenitor of the New England Phillips family in America.

Phillips entered Harvard University at the age of eleven, and graduated in 1735, at the age of 15. He returned for a master's degree, which he earned in 1738. While studying theology and medicine under his father, he headed schools in Andover and neighboring towns.

== Career ==
In 1741, he moved to Exeter, New Hampshire, where he headed a private school for a year, and afterwards a public school for a year.

From 1767 to 1775, he served on the council of Sir John Wentworth, 1st Baronet, the governor of the Province of New Hampshire. He represented Exeter in the New Hampshire General Court from 1771 to 1773, and also served as a judge of the inferior court of common pleas from 1772 to 1775. He also served as the deputy of the first New Hampshire Provincial Congress and a member of the Provincial Council. In 1772, he was chosen to be the colonel of a militia called the Exeter cadets.

In 1762, he became the first major donor of Dartmouth College, when he sent a gift to Eleazar Wheelock. In 1770, as the college, then named Moor's Charity School, wished to relocate to Hanover, New Hampshire, Phillips donated large sums of money and land to the college. He also donated £37 to the college, establishing the Phillips Professorship of Theology. He was a trustee of Dartmouth from 1773 to 1793.

He and his wife founded Phillips Exeter Academy in Exeter, New Hampshire, in 1781, donating $134,000, and served as the president of the Board of Trustees until his death. His nephew, Samuel Phillips, Jr., had, three years prior, founded the nearby Phillips Academy in Andover, Massachusetts. Inspired by the success of the school, Phillips was encouraged by his nephew to create his own school in Exeter. John Phillips' donations in land and money totaled $31,000. These two schools, longtime rivals, are among the oldest and most prestigious preparatory schools in the United States.

== Personal life ==
On August 4, 1743, he married Sarah (Emery) Gilman, a wealthy widow. He had previously proposed to her daughter, Tabitha, but was turned down. At her death on October 9, 1765, Phillips was the wealthiest man in Exeter. He married his second wife, Elizabeth (Dennet) Hale, on November 3, 1767. He died on April 21, 1795, in Exeter, and left no children. Phillips left one third of his large estate to Phillips Academy and two-thirds to Phillips Exeter Academy. His donations to Exeter totaled about $60,000. He was awarded an LL.D. degree by Dartmouth College in 1777.
