= Samuel Phillips (minister) =

The Reverend Samuel Phillips
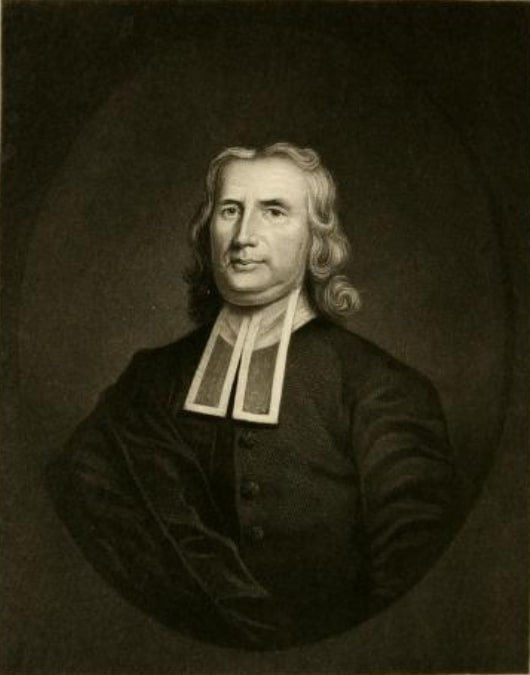
- Samuel Phillips by John Greenwood

1st Pastor of the South Church, Andover, Massachusetts
- In office October 17, 1711 – June 5, 1771
- Preceded by: office established
- Succeeded by: Jonathan French

Personal details
- Born: Samuel Phillips; February 17, 1690 Salem, Massachusetts Bay Colony, British America
- Died: June 5, 1771 (aged 81) Andover, Province of Massachusetts Bay, British America
- Resting place: South Church Cemetery, Andover, MA; 42°39′14.05″N 71°8′35.93″W
- Spouse: Hannah White (m. 1711)
- Children: Mary (b. 1712); Samuel (b. 1715); Lydia (b. 1717); John (b. 1719); William (b. 1722)
- Parent(s): Samuel Phillips; Mary Emerson
- Education: Harvard College, 1708

Samuel Phillips (February 17, 1690 (Note: One source claims his date of birth is either February 17, 1689 or 1690, another claims either 1690 or 1691, but according to two different sources he was born in 1690.) – June 5, 1771) was an American Congregational minister and the first pastor of the South Church in Andover, Massachusetts. His son, John Phillips, was the founder of Phillips Exeter Academy, and his grandson, Samuel Phillips Jr., was the founder of Phillips Academy Andover and briefly the lieutenant governor of Massachusetts.

== Early life ==
Samuel Phillips was born in Salem, Massachusetts on February 17, 1690. Phillips was the second eldest child and eldest son of Samuel Phillips and Mary Emerson (Note: Samuel Phillips (March 23, 1657 – October 13, 1722) was a goldsmith born in Salem, Massachusetts to Rev. Samuel Phillips and Sarah Appleton (see note). He is apparently the founder of the family fortune, deciding not to enter the ministry and instead the business of trade, accumulating wealth. He married Mary Emerson (March 7, 1665 – October 13, 1703), daughter of Rev. John Emerson of Gloucester and Ruth Symonds and granddaughter of Deputy Governor Samuel Symonds of Ipswich, on May 26, 1687. They had seven children together including Rev. Samuel Phillips (1690 – 1771) of Andover. After her death in 1703, he married Sarah (Pickman) Mayfield on April 27, 1704 and had one more child with her.) (Note: Four sources cite Mrs. Emerson's name as "Mary" and two different sources cite "Sarah") and one of eight siblings, including one half-sister:

1. Patience died young.
2. Sarah (January 28, 1692 – 1737) married William White (Note: Dea. William White [Esq.] (January 18, 1694 – December 11, 1737) was a clothier, farmer, Deacon, and grist mill owner. He was born in Boston and the fourth child of John White and Lydia Gilman (see note) but resided in Haverhill. According to White's grandson, Judge Daniel Appleton White, a few days after his marriage to Sarah Phillips in 1716 in Boston, they began to make their way back to Haverhill. On the way they stopped at the South Church of Andover, where his brother-in-law Rev. Samuel Phillips was pastor, to attend a public worship. Rev. Phillips gave them a copy of the sermon, titled The Prudent Wife a Choice Blessing, prepared specifically for them. White is credited as the first person to plant potatoes in Haverhill, which he did in 1718. He harvested four bushels and distributed his crop to his neighbors. On January 2, 1721, he and his brother Samuel, husband of Ruth Phillips, sister of Sarah, were given permission to construct a grist and fulling mill on the Sawmill River, moving their operation from Mill Brook due to a scarcity of water. He was a magistrate of Essex County, a Captain of the company of Haverhill, and the Representative of Haverhill in the General Court in 1733 and 1734. His health had been "always precarious". In his will, written six days before his death, his estate in Haverhill was given to Sarah and the rest was split among his sons and daughters. His total estate was valued at £4070.3, over half of which was in real estate.), of Haverhill, in Boston June 12, 1716. Before her marriage, she was probably living with a relative or friend in Boston as she was living with her father Samuel Phillips of Salem. They had eleven children.
3. Mary (August 5, 1694 – October 5, 1785) married Capt. George Abbot, of Andover, in Salem November 29, 1721.
4. Ruth (September 4, 1696 – ?) married Samuel White, of Haverhill, in 1718 or April 21, 1724, in Ipswich according to the Hamlet Parish Church record, now a part of Hamilton, Massachusetts. They had seven children.
5. Elizabeth (March 5, 1699 – August 7, 1700) died young.
6. John (June 22, 1701 – April 19, 1768) was a Boston merchant, bookseller and publisher, deacon of the Brattle Street Church, colonel of the Boston Regiment, and a Justice of the Peace and of the Quorum. He is the grandfather of John Phillips, first mayor of Boston, great-grandfather of Wendell Phillips. He married Mary Buttolph (May 8, 1703 – August 15, 1742) on November 21, 1723, and after she died Abigail Webb of Fairfield, Connecticut.

Child with second wife Sarah Mayfield, married April 27, 1704:

1. Patience (August 8, 1706 – November 14, 1773) married Rev. David Jewett (Note: Rev. David Jewett (June 10, 1714 – June 6, 1783) was a pastor in New London, Connecticut, and a physician. Born in Rowley, he graduated from Harvard College in 1736. Before moving to New London, he became a missionary for the Mahicans or Mohegans, earning the trust of the tribe and sachem and preaching for them often, including after the death of Ben Uncas in 1769, the last Sachem. On October 3, 1739, he was ordained pastor of the Second Church in New London, Connecticut (now Montville). He was an army chaplain in 1756 and during the French and Indian War. During the American Revolutionary War, he was a surgeon for the 4th Battalion of Connecticut State Troops.) of New London, Connecticut, and had two children. She met Jewitt while he was a theology student at Harvard. Jewitt was ill, and she helped bring him back to good health. She also, according to parish records in New London, was born with one hand, but was still able to perform most of the tasks those with two could.

His grandfather was Rev. Samuel Phillips (Note: Rev. Samuel Phillips (1625 – April 22, 1696) was a Puritan minister and Pastor of the church in Rowley from 1682 to 1696. He was born in Boxted, Essex, England to Rev. George Phillips and Elizabeth Sergent, who died shortly after their arrival in Salem on June 12, 1630, on the Arbella. He was the eldest of eight children. He attended Harvard College at the expense of the Watertown church as a courtesy for his father's work and graduated in 1650. He settled in Rowley in 1651 and married Sarah Appleton (1628 – July 15, 1714), born in England to Samuel and Mary (Everhard) Appleton, in October. They had 10 children together. After settling Phillips preached at the church in Rowley, serving alongside the current pastor at the time Rev. Ezekiel Rogers. He preached the Artillery Election Sermon in 1675 and the Election Sermon in 1678 although none of his sermons are believed to have been published. He was ordained pastor of said church in 1682. He was imprisoned for a brief time in September, 1687 for calling the royalist agent, Edward Randolph a "wicked man," stripping Phillips of his honor. He died on April 22, 1696, "greatly beloved and lamented.") of Rowley and his great-grandfather George Phillips of Watertown, one of the first to settle in Watertown and founder of its First Congregational Church.

Phillips was admitted to Harvard College in July 1704 and graduated in 1708. After about a year of teaching in Chebacco (formerly a parish of Ipswich and currently Essex), Massachusetts, he became more focused on preparing for the ministry.

== Ministry ==
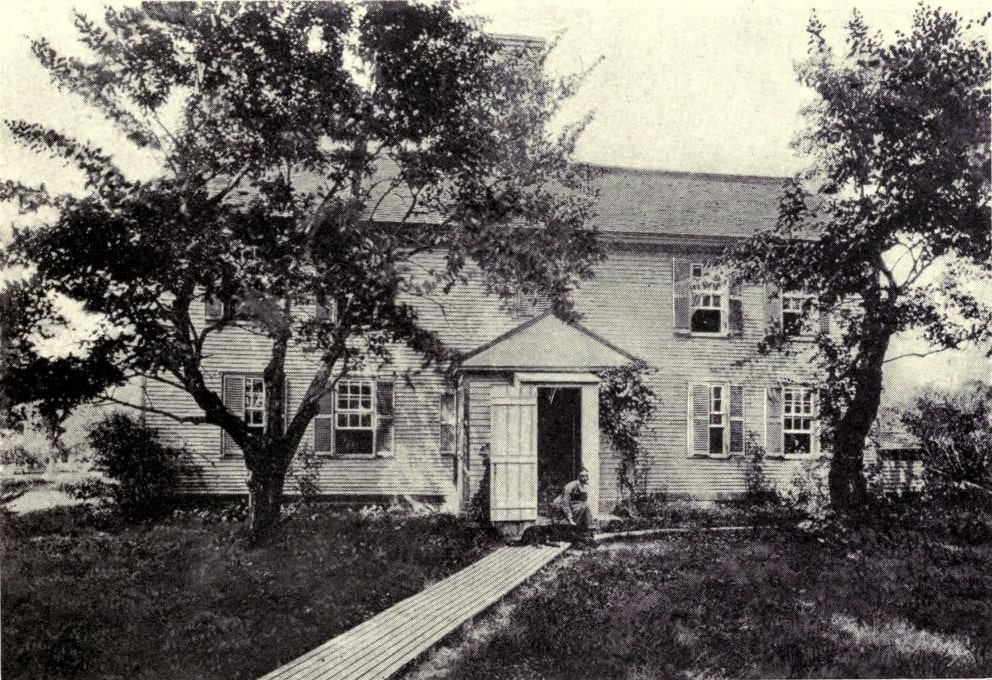
Ministry house, home of Rev. Phillips

Phillips preached in Norton for a short period of time, but was not ordained. "The influence of the minister of the old Parish of Taunton was unfavorable."

In 1710 Phillips came to Andover to serve as the pastor of the newly founded South Church. He began preaching on April 30 of that year. On December 12 the Parish voted unanimously in his favor. He declined, however, to take on the role immediately after his approval due to his young age. On October 17, 1711, the day of the official organization of the church and at the age of 22, Phillips was ordained as the first pastor of the South Church. He "preached the [first] Sermon himself, from Ezek. 3:17."

While pastor he published a number of works, many of which were written for members of the parish to take as guidance. He preached an Artillery Sermon, an Election Sermon, and a Convention Sermon. Reverend John Webb (Note: Rev. John Webb (August, 1687 – April 16, 1750) was a minister and first pastor of the New North Church, now known as St. Stephen's Church, in Boston. He was born in Braintree, Massachusetts, to John Webb, also of Braintree. He entered Harvard College in 1704, graduating in 1708 alongside Rev. Samuel Phillips and again with a second degree in 1711. He began preaching shortly afterward and ordained as pastor of said New North Church on October 20, 1714 which had recently been organized on May 5th of that year. He was very much liked by the church and its members. The Boston Gazette wrote on May 1, 1750, "he has been a burning and a shining light ever since [his ordainment], which has greatly increased under his lively ministry, and in whom [members of the church] have highly rejoyced and been very happy." He remained pastor until his death. He married Frances Bromfield (June 8, 1694–September 14, 1721), daughter of Edward Bromfield Esq., in 1715. She died of smallpox.), in the preface of Advice to A Child, writes of Phillips:

"The discourses he has published heretofore, have given him this testimony in the consciences of all good Christians who have read them. That he is a well-qualified and faithful minister of Jesus Christ."

Phillips had at least two African American servants, Salem and Rama. After Phillips died, they became servants of Rev. Jonathan French, the next pastor. They had a child named Cyrus (baptized December 23, 1770) and another Titus (b. November 24, 1774).

Phillips remained pastor of the church until his death on June 5, 1771, serving nearly sixty years. Jonathan French succeeded him as second pastor.

== Marriage and children ==
Phillips married Hannah White (1691 – January 7, 1773) of Haverhill, daughter of John White (Note: John White (March 8, 1663-64 – November 20, 1727) was a "highly respectable and influential" figure born in Haverhill, Massachusetts, to John White (b. 1639-40) and Hannah French. He is a grandson of William White, one of the first settlers of Haverhill landing in Ipswich in 1635 and one of the grantees of the Indian deed of Haverhill, dated November 15, 1642. He served as Town Clerk in 1694, the Representative of Haverhill in the General Court for eight years, 1700,02,03,08,13,15,16,19, Captain of the Haverhill company, and magistrate of the County Court. Rev. Samuel Phillips (1690 – 1771), his son-in-law after his marriage to Hannah in 1712, described him as the "Worshipful John White." He married Lydia Gilman on October 24, 1687.) of Haverhill and Lydia Gilman on January 17, 1712. (Note: The American Society of Church History cites Phillips' marriage to Hannah White having taken place on January 7, 1712.) Together they had five children:

1. Mary (November 30, 1712 – November 24, 1737) married Samuel Appleton (a distant cousin), of Haverhill, on October 12, 1736. She died in childbed at the age of 24, her only child still-born.
2. Samuel (February 13, 1715 – August 21, 1790) was a teacher, businessman, a deacon of South Church, a Representative to the General Court and the Convention of Deputies, and a member of the Governor's Council. He graduated from Harvard University in 1734. He was a founder of Phillips Academy along with his brother John Phillips (see below) and especially his son Judge Samuel Phillips and president of its board of trustees from 1778 to 1790.
3. Lydia (June 10, 1717 – November 4, 1749) married Dr. Parker Clark, of Newbury, on May 18, 1742. They had four children.
4. John (December 17, 1719 – April 21, 1795) was a teacher, merchant, judge, and trustee of Dartmouth College. He graduated from Harvard University in 1735. He is also a founder of Phillips Academy and sole founder of Phillips Exeter Academy.
5. William (June 25, 1722 – January 15, 1804) was a merchant, representative, senator, member of the Constitutional Convention, deacon of the Old South Church in Boston, and trustee of Phillips Academy.

Hannah died on January 7, 1773, at the age of 82. (Note: The American Society of Church History says Hannah White died on January 11, 1773.)

== Death and legacy ==
Phillips died on June 5, 1771. Over the course of his ministry, he baptised 2143 people including 30 adults and witnessed the parish grow from 35 in 1711 to 573. He is the longest-serving pastor of the church to date. He is buried in the South Church Cemetery, Andover, Massachusetts along with other members of the Phillips family.

== Publications ==
Phillips wrote a number of publications over his lifetime covering a variety of subjects. The following is a complete list of his works:

Title	Year Published	Notes
Elegy upon the death of Nicholas Noyes and George Curwen	1718	Reverend Nicholas Noyes (December 22, 1647 – December 13, 1717) was a minister who served as the assistant reverend to Reverend John Higginson during the Salem witch trials in 1692. He was born in Newton to Nicholas Noyes (1616 – 1701) and Mary Cutting (1622 – 1701) and graduated from Harvard College in 1667. Higginson and Noyes were both ministers of the First Church of Salem, serving from 1660 – 1708 and 1683 – 1717 respectively. He may not gave regretted participating in the witch trials given that his signature is not present on related documents asking for forgiveness. He died in Salem of brain hemorrhage.
A word in Season	1727	
Three plain, practical Discourses	1728	
Advice to a Child	1729	Its preface was written by John Webb, friend and classmate of Phillips and pastor of the New North Church, now known as St. Stephen's Church, in Boston (see note).
The History of the Saviour	1738	
The Orthodox Christian	1738	
A Minister's Address to his People	1739	
A Preface to Mr. Barnard's funeral sermon for Mr. Abiel Abbot	1739	
Artillery Election Sermon	1741	
Living Water to be had for Asking	1750	
A Sermon at the General Election	1750	
A Sermon at the Installation of Rev. Samuel Chandler	1751	Rev. Samuel Chandler (1712 – April 16, 1775) was a clergyman born in Andover. He was ordained in the second parish of York, Maine, from January 20, 1742, to 1751 and served as a member of the clergy of Gloucester, Massachusetts, from November 13, 1751, until his death.
Sinner's Refusal to come to Christ Reproved	1753	
The Necessity of God's Drawing, in Order to Man's Coming unto Christ	1753	Delivered in Boston on June 3, 1753
Sermon at the Anniversary Convention of Ministers	1753	Delivered in Boston May 31, 1753.
Sermon at the Ordination of Nathan Holt	1759	Nathan Holt (1725 – August 2, 1792) (Note: The Historical Manual of the South Church in Andover, Mass. claims Holt died on August 1, 1792.) was born and baptized in the South Parish of Andover. His father Nicholas Holt and mother were also members of the South Church. He was ordained pastor of the church of Danvers, Massachusetts, on January 3, 1759.
Seasonable Advice to a Neighbor	1761	
Address to Young People	1763	
Discourse on Justification	1766	Delivered in Boston
A Sermon on Suicide	1767	Written after the death of David Gray, who committed suicide January 7, 1767. Gray was not allowed a Christian burial at the South Church, of which he was a member, but was posthumously buried there.

== Bibliography ==
- Allis, Frederick Scouller Jr. (1979). Youth From Every Quarter: A Bicentennial History of Phillips Academy, Andover. Andover: Phillips Academy. ISBN 978-0-87451-157-4.
- American Society of Church History (1921). Loetscher, Frederick (ed.). Papers of the American Society of Church History. New York: G.P Putnam's Sons. p. 274.
- Andover Historical Commission (1977). "232 Salem Street". Andover Historic Preservation. Memorial Hall Library Andover. Archived from the original on September 14, 2023.
- Babson, John James (1891). Notes and Additions to the History of Gloucester: Second Series. Salem: Salem Press Publishing and Printing Company.
- Bond, Henry; Jones, Horatio Gates (1860). Genealogies of the Families and Descendants of the Early Settlers of Watertown, Massachusetts, Including Waltham and Weston: To which is Appended the Early History of the Town (2 ed.). Boston: Little, Brown & Company.
- Carpenter, Charles Carroll (1903). Biographical Catalogue of the Trustees, Teachers and Students of Phillips Academy Andover 1778-1830. Andover: The Andover Press. hdl:2027/njp.32101013921109.
- Congregational Library (2011). "1843 Boston Almanac church engravings: New North Church, Hanover Street". Congregational Library Exhibits. Congregational Library. Archived from the original on December 9, 2018.
- Emerson, Benjamin Kendall; Gordon, George Augustus (1900). The Ipswich Emersons. A.D. 1636-1900. Boston: David Clapp & Son.
- First Church in Salem. "First Church Succession of Ministers". First Church in Salem, Unitarian Universalist. First Church in Salem. Archived from the original on December 10, 2018.
- Fuess, Claude Moore (1917). An Old New England School: A History of Phillips Academy Andover. Boston: Houghton Mifflin Company.
- Harvey, Oscar Jewell (1897). A History of Lodge No. 61, F. and A. M., Wilkesbarré, PA. Wilkesbarré, PA: Lodge No. 61, Wilkesbarré, PA.
- Jacobus, Donald Lines (1933). The Bulkeley Genealogy: Rev. Peter Bulkeley. New Haven, CT: The Tuttle, Morehouse & Taylor Company.
- Jewett, Frederic Clarke (1908). History and Genealogy of the Jewetts of America. Vol. 1. New York: The Grafton Press. ISBN 978-5-87084-781-8.
- Mooar, George (1859). Historical manual of the South church in Andover, Mass. Andover, MA: Warren F. Draper.
- New England Historic Genealogical Society (1871). Dean, John Ward (ed.). The New England Historical and Genealogical Register. Vol. 25. Boston: The New England Historic Genealogical Society.
- New England Historic Genealogical Society (1885). Dean, John Ward (ed.). The New England Historical and Genealogical Register. Vol. 39. Boston: New England Historic Genealogical Society.
- New England Historic Genealogical Society (1900). Dean, John Ward (ed.). The New England Historical and Genealogical Register. Vol. 54. Boston: New England Historic Genealogical Society.
- New England Historic Genealogical Society (2001). Dunkle, Robert J.; Lainhart, Ann S. (eds.). "The Records of the Churches of Boston" (PDF). American Ancestors. Boston: The New England Historic Genealogical Society. Archived from the original (PDF) on December 9, 2018.
- Park, William E. (1878). The Earlier Annals of Phillips Academy. n.p.
- Partridge, Dennis N. (April 3, 2013). "Rev. George Phillips Genealogy". Access Genealogy. Dennis N. Partridge. Archived from the original on October 5, 2018.
- Phillips, Samuel (1753). Sinner's Refusal to come to Christ Reproved. Boston: S. Kneeland.
- Salem Witch Museum. "Site of Reverend Nicholas Noyes Home". The 1692 Salem Witch Trials. Salem Witch Museum. Archived from the original on October 6, 2018.
- Schutz, John A. (1997). Legislators of the Massachusetts General Court, 1691-1780: A Biographical Dictionary. Boston: Northeastern University Press. ISBN 978-1-55553-304-5.
- Taylor, John (1856). A Memoir Of His Honor Samuel Phillips, LL. D. Boston: Congregational Board of Publication.
- The Essex Institute (1910). Vital Records of Ipswich, Massachusetts to the End of the Year 1849. Vol. 2. Salem, MA: The Essex Institute.
- The Essex Institute (1924). Vital Records of Salem, Massachusetts, to the End of the Year 1849. Vol. 4. Salem, MA: The Essex Institute.
- Topsfield Historical Society (1912a). Vital Records of Andover, Massachusetts, to the End of the Year 1849. Vol. 1. Topsfield, MA: Topsfield Historical Society.
- Topsfield Historical Society (1912b). Vital Records of Andover, Massachusetts, to the End of the Year 1849. Vol. 2. Topsfield, MA: Topsfield Historical Society.
- Topsfield Historical Society (1911). Vital Records of Haverhill, Massachusetts, to the End of the Year 1849. Vol. 2. Topsfield, MA: Topsfield Historical Society.
- Torrey, Clarence Almon (1985). New England Marriages Prior to 1700. Baltimore: Genealogical Publishing Company. ISBN 978-0-8063-1102-9.
- White, Daniel Appleton; Richards, Annie Frances (1889). The Descendants of William White, of Haverhill, Mass. Boston: American Printing and Engraving Company.
- Williams, Myron Richards (1957). The Story of Phillips Exeter. Exeter, NH: Phillips Exeter Academy.
