= Samuel Phillips Jr. =

American politician and businessman

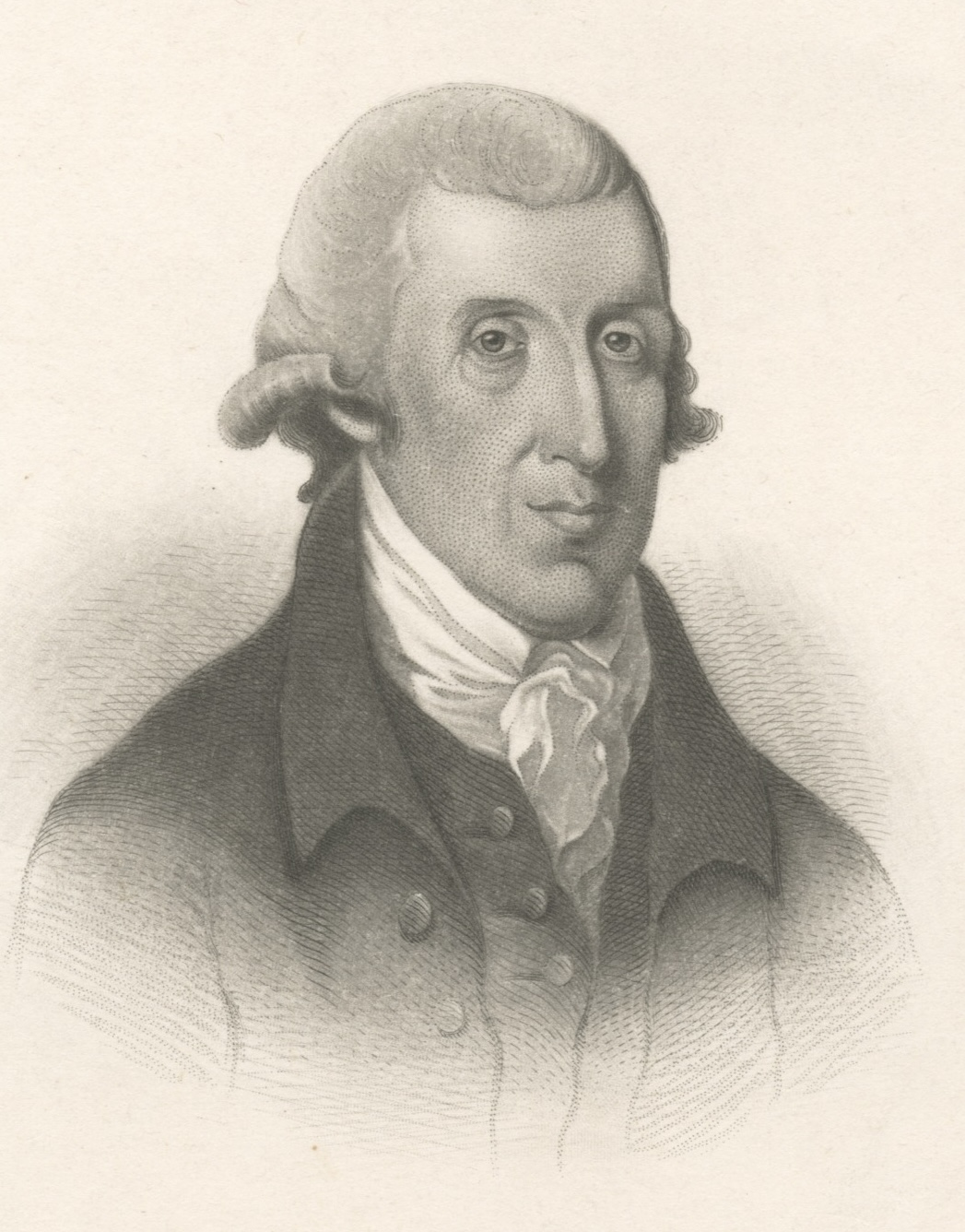

5th Lieutenant Governor of Massachusetts
- In office 1801–1802
- Governor: Caleb Strong
- Preceded by: Vacant (last held by Moses Gill)
- Succeeded by: Edward Robbins

Personal details
- Born: February 5, 1752 present-day North Andover, Massachusetts (then Andover)
- Died: February 10, 1802 (aged 50)
- Resting place: South Church Cemetery, Andover, MA
- Party: Federalist
- Spouse: Phebe Phillips

Samuel Phillips Jr. (February 5, 1752 – February 10, 1802) was an American merchant, manufacturer, politician, and the founder of Phillips Academy in Andover, Massachusetts. Phillips is considered a pioneer in American education.

== Biography ==
Samuel Phillips Jr. was born in Andover, Massachusetts (in a part that is now North Andover). He was a descendant of the Rev. George Phillips of Watertown, the progenitor of the New England Phillips family in America. His grandfather Rev. Samuel Phillips was the first and long-time pastor of the South Church in Andover.

A graduate of Governor Dummer Academy in 1767, and Harvard College in 1771, Phillips was a very active and able member of the Massachusetts Provincial Congress from 1775 to 1780. He served as a delegate to the state constitutional convention in 1779 and 1780, and was a state senator from 1780 to 1802, holding the office of President of the Massachusetts Senate from 1785 until his death. For a short period before his death, Phillips also served as the fifth Lieutenant Governor of Massachusetts. In November 1789 he escorted newly elected President George Washington on his progress through Massachusetts to Concord.

Beginning in 1775, Phillips aided the revolutionary cause by producing gunpowder for Washington's troops at a mill on the Shawsheen River in Andover. Though plagued by difficulties, the powder mill remained active into the 1790s. During this period, Phillips also ran a paper mill in Andover.

In the midst of the Revolution, and with financial backing from his father and his uncle, Dr. John Phillips, Samuel Phillips Jr. founded Phillips Academy in Andover. It opened on April 21, 1778. He was a charter member of the American Academy of Arts and Sciences in 1780. Like the rest of his family and many Massachusetts patriots, Samuel Phillips Jr. was a strict Calvinist, but he was also a practical visionary concerned about the improvement of society. In the preamble to his constitution for the new school, Phillips wrote: "Youth is the important period, on the improvement or neglect of which depend the most important consequences to individuals and the community." He set out "to lay the foundation of a public free School or Academy for the purpose of instructing Youth, not only in English and Latin Grammar, Writing, Arithmetic, and those Sciences, wherein they are commonly taught; but more especially to learn them the Great End and Real Business of Living." From the first, financial aid scholarships were part of the program of Phillips Academy: "This Seminary shall be ever equally open to Youth, with requisit qualification, from every quarter."

== See also ==
- The Governor's Academy
- Phillips Academy
- Phillips Exeter Academy

== Bibliography ==
- Allis, Frederick S. Jr., Youth from Every Quarter: A Bicentennial History of Phillips Academy, Andover (University Press of New England, 1978).
- Taylor, John. A Memoir of His Honor Samuel Phillips

Massachusetts Senate
Preceded by Samuel Adams	4th President of the Massachusetts Senate; 1785—1802	Succeeded by David Cobb
Political offices
Preceded by Moses Gill	Lieutenant Governor of Massachusetts; 1801–1802	Succeeded by Edward Robbins
