= Distinguished Civilian Service Award =

Distinguished Civilian Service Award refers to one of the following awards presented by the United States government:

- Chairman of the Joint Chiefs of Staff Joint Distinguished Civilian Service Award
- Decoration for Distinguished Civilian Service
- Department of Defense Distinguished Civilian Service Award
- Navy Distinguished Civilian Service Award
- President's Award for Distinguished Federal Civilian Service
