= Joint Meritorious Civilian Service Medal =

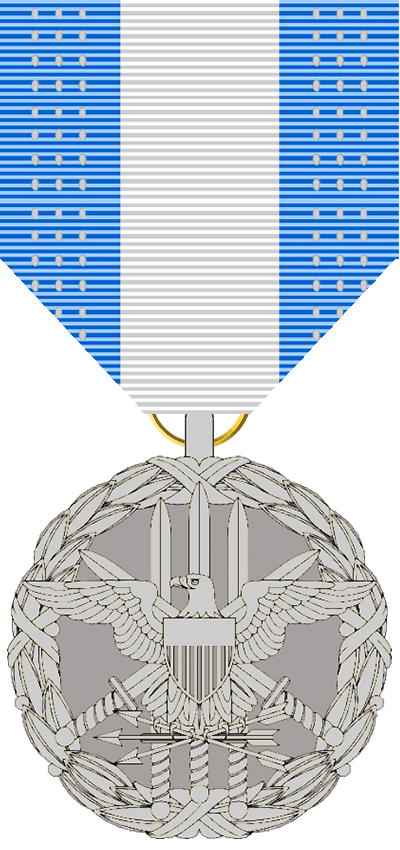
- Sponsored by: Chairman of the Joint Chiefs of Staff
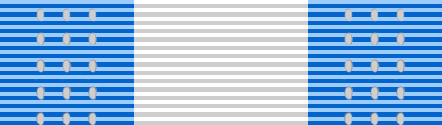
- Ribbon

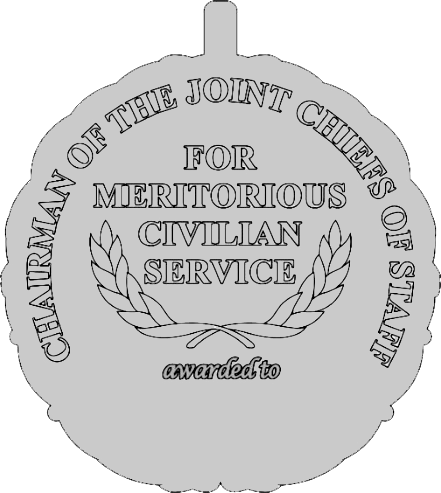
- Reverse

Precedence
- Next (higher): Joint Distinguished Civilian Service Medal
- Next (lower): Joint Civilian Service Commendation Award

The Joint Meritorious Civilian Service Medal (formerly the Joint Meritorious Civilian Service Award) is the second highest civilian service award of the U.S. Chairman of the Joint Chiefs of Staff (CJCS).

== Eligibility ==
This award is granted to any civilian employee of the Joint Staff, combatant commands, joint organizations reporting to or through the CJCS, or any other employee designated by the CJCS for service that is exceptionally meritorious and does not meet the level required for the Joint Distinguished Civilian Service Medal.

The award cannot be received in conjunction with a Secretary of Defense award for the same service. The award normally requires at least five years time in service but can be given for short duration deployments or details. The level of service for this award should have been given the direct attention or led to direct interaction with the CJCS.

== Description ==
The award is a silver-plated medal with the Department of Defense seal (eagle clutching arrows with an American shield in foreground) in front of two crossed swords and two vertical swords. The medal is suspended from a light blue ribbon with a wide white center stripe and six dashed pin stripes, three on each side.
