= Joint Chiefs of Staff =

Senior-most US military leaders

- JCS
- Joint Chiefs of Staff identification badge
- Role: Advisory board providing professional military advice to the secretary of defense and the president
- Established in practice: 1942
- Constituting instrument: National Security Act of 1947 currently codified at 10 U.S.C. § 151
- Predecessor entities: Joint Board (1903–1942)

Members
- Chairman: Gen Dan Caine, USAF
- Vice Chairman: Gen Christopher J. Mahoney, USMC
- Number of members: Eight

Administration
- Parent agency: U.S. Department of Defense
- Staff organization: The Joint Staff (for the chairman and the vice chairman; the service chiefs and the National Guard Bureau chief have their own staffs assisting them)
- Seat: The Pentagon

The Joint Chiefs of Staff (JCS) is the body of the most senior uniformed leaders within the United States Department of Defense, which advises the president of the United States, the secretary of defense, the Homeland Security Council and the National Security Council on military matters. The composition of the Joint Chiefs of Staff is defined by statute, and it consists of a chairman, a vice chairman, the chiefs of the Army, Marine Corps, Navy, Air Force, and Space Force, and the chief of the National Guard Bureau. Each of the individual service chiefs, outside their Joint Chiefs obligations, works directly under the secretaries of their respective military departments, i.e. the secretary of the Army, the secretary of the Navy, and the secretary of the Air Force.

Following the Goldwater–Nichols Act in 1986, the Joint Chiefs of Staff do not have operational command authority, either individually or collectively, as the chain of command goes from the president to the secretary of defense, and from the secretary to the regional combatant commanders. Goldwater–Nichols also created the office of vice chairman, and the chairman is now designated as the principal military adviser to the secretary of defense, the Homeland Security Council, the National Security Council and the president. The Joint Staff is a headquarters staff in the Pentagon, composed of personnel from each of the six service branches, that assists the chairman and the vice chairman in discharging their responsibilities and is managed by the director of the Joint Staff.

== Role and responsibilities ==
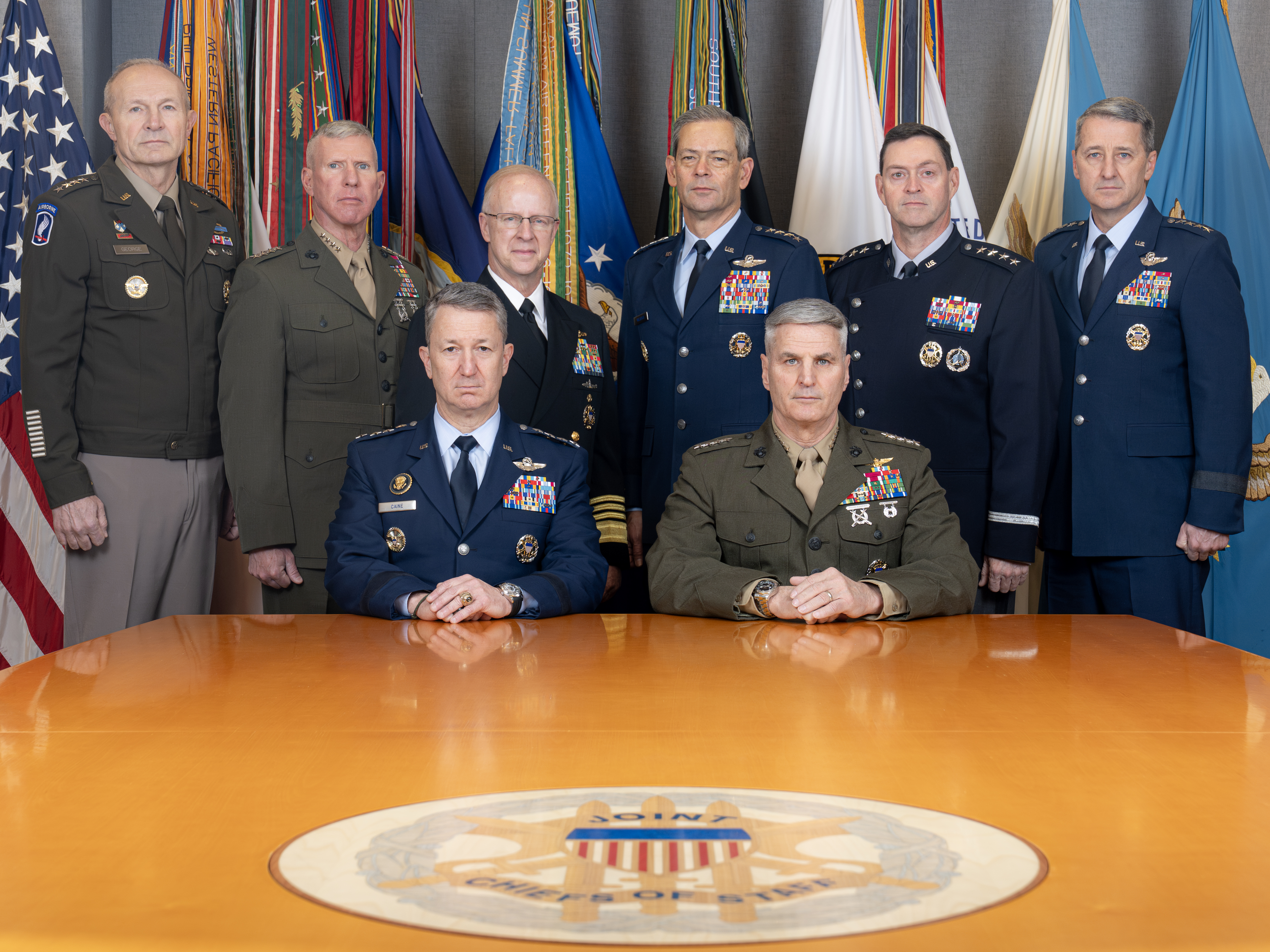
The Joint Chiefs of Staff in January 2026

After the 1986 reorganization of the Armed Forces undertaken by the Goldwater–Nichols Act, the Joint Chiefs of Staff do not possess operational authority over troops or other units. Responsibility for conducting military operations goes from the president to the secretary of defense directly to the commanders of the unified combatant commands and thus bypasses the Joint Chiefs of Staff completely.

Today, their primary responsibility is to ensure personnel readiness, policy, planning, and training of their respective services for the combatant commanders to utilize. In addition, the chairman of the Joint Chiefs of Staff acts as the chief military advisor to the president and the secretary of defense. In this strictly advisory role, the Joint Chiefs constitute the third-highest deliberative body for military policy, after the National Security Council and the Homeland Security Council, which includes the president and other officials besides the chairman of the Joint Chiefs. While serving as the chairman or vice chairman of the Joint Chiefs of Staff, chief of staff of the Army, commandant of the Marine Corps, chief of naval operations, chief of staff of the Air Force, chief of space operations, or commandant of the Coast Guard, basic pay is $18,808.20 a month, plus a $4,000 per year personal money allowance.

Current members of the Joint Chiefs of Staff
Position	Name	Service	Start	Appointer	Flag
Chairman of the Joint Chiefs of Staff	General; Dan Caine	United States Air Force	11 April 2025	Trump	Flag of the Chairman of the U.S. Joint Chiefs of Staff
Vice Chairman of the Joint Chiefs of Staff	General; Christopher J. Mahoney	United States Marine Corps	1 October 2025	Trump	Flag of the Vice Chairman of the Joint Chiefs of Staff
Chief of Staff of the Army (acting)	General Christopher LaNeve General; Christopher LaNeve	United States Army	2 April 2026	—N/a	Flag of the Chief of Staff of the United States Army
Commandant of the Marine Corps	General; Eric Smith	United States Marine Corps	22 September 2023	Biden	Flag of the Commandant of the United States Marine Corps
Chief of Naval Operations	Admiral; Daryl Caudle	United States Navy	25 August 2025	Trump	Flag of the United States Chief of Naval Operations
Chief of Staff of the Air Force	General; Kenneth S. Wilsbach	United States Air Force	3 November 2025	Trump	Flag of the Chief of Staff of the United States Air Force
Chief of Space Operations	General; Douglas A. Schiess	United States Space Force	3 September 2026	Trump	
Chief of the National Guard Bureau	General; Steven Nordhaus	United States Air Force	2 October 2024	Biden	Flag of the National Guard Bureau
Commandant of the Coast Guard (non-member attendee)	Admiral; Kevin Lunday	United States Coast Guard	15 January 2026 (Note: Lunday served as Acting Commandant of the Coast Guard from 21 January 2025 – 15 January 2026.)	Trump	Flag of the Commandant of the United States Coast Guard

Although it is a branch of the Armed Forces pursuant to 14 U.S.C. § 101, the Coast Guard operates under the Department of Homeland Security rather than the Department of Defense, except when the president (e.g., in times of war or national emergency) transfers it to the Department of the Navy. The commandant of the Coast Guard is not a de jure member of the Joint Chiefs of Staff but is sometimes regarded as a de facto member, being entitled to the same supplemental pay as the Joint Chiefs, and occasionally will attend meetings of the JCS by invitation. Unlike the Joint Chiefs, who are not actually in the military's operational chain of command, the commandant is both the administrative and the operational commander of the Coast Guard.

== History ==
=== Joint Board ===
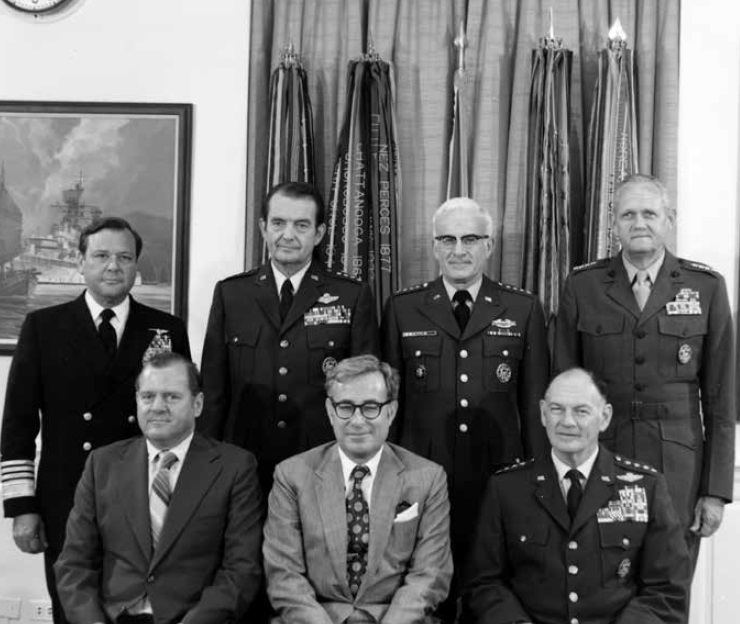
United States Secretary of Defense Harold Brown and United States Deputy Secretary of Defense Charles W. Duncan Jr with Chairman of the Joint Chiefs of Staff General George S. Brown and the other members of the Joint Chiefs of Staff at the Pentagon in 1977

As the U.S. military grew in size following the American Civil War, joint military action between the Army and Navy became increasingly difficult. The Army and Navy were unsupportive of each other at either the planning or operational level and were constrained by disagreements during the Spanish–American War in the Caribbean campaigns. The Joint Army and Navy Board was established in 1903 by President Theodore Roosevelt, comprising representatives from the military heads and chief planners of both the Navy's General Board and the Army's General Staff. The Joint Board, acting as an "advisory committee," was created to plan joint operations and resolve problems of common rivalry between the two services.

Yet, the Joint Board accomplished little, as its charter gave it no authority to enforce its decisions. The Joint Board could not originate its own opinions and was thus limited to commenting only on the problems submitted to it by the secretaries of war and Navy. As a result, the Joint Board had little to no impact on the manner in which the United States conducted World War I. After World War I, the two secretaries agreed in 1919 to reestablish and revitalize the Joint Board. The mission of the General Staff was to develop plans for mobilization for the next war. In these, the U.S. was always designated "blue" and potential enemies were assigned various other colors. Now, the Joint Board's membership was to include the chiefs of staff, their deputies, and the chief of war plans division for the Army and the director of plans division for the Navy. Under the Joint Board was to be a staff called the Joint Planning Committee to serve the board. Along with new membership, the Joint Board could initiate recommendations on its own initiative. However, the Joint Board still did not possess the legal authority to enforce its decisions.

=== World War II ===
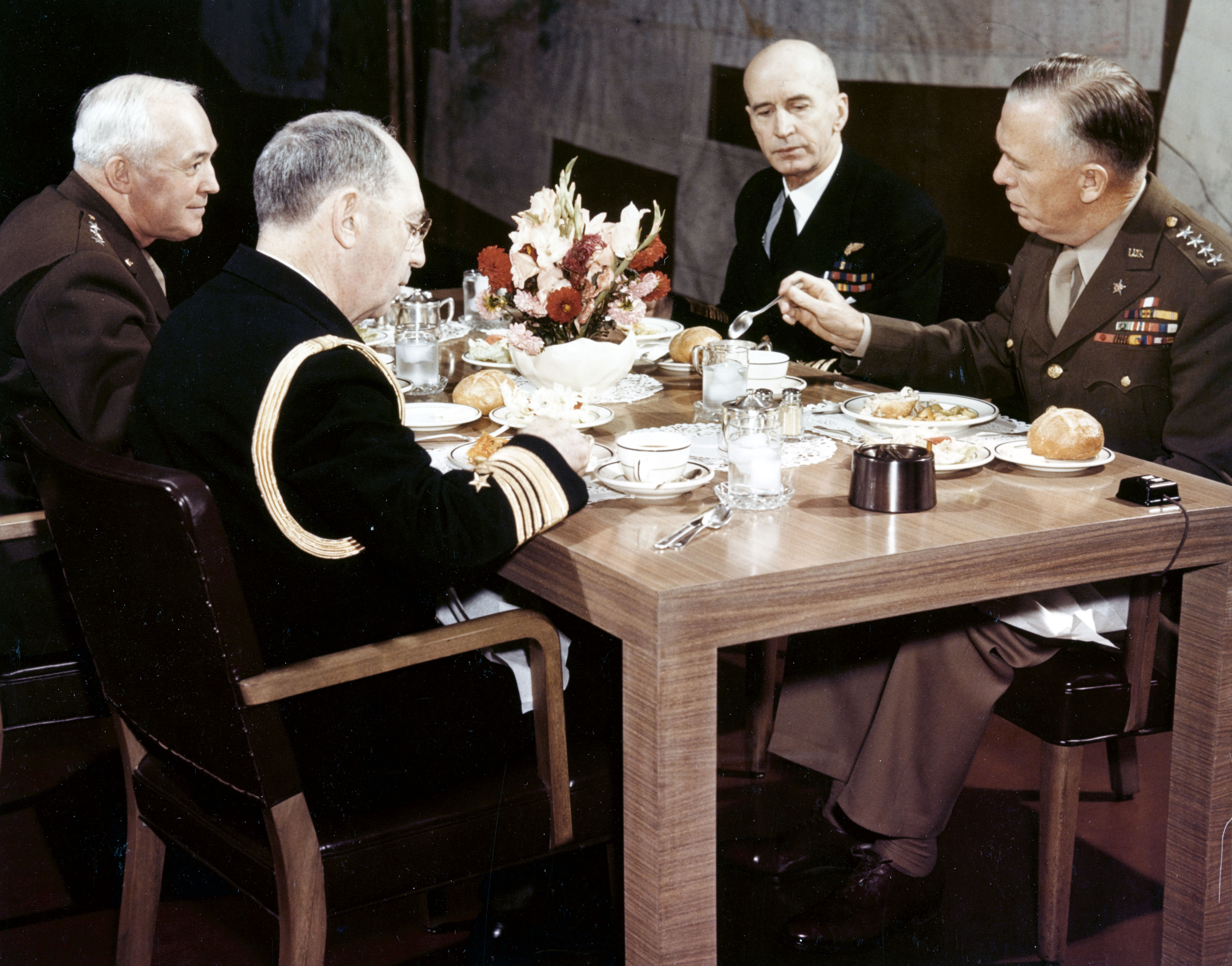
Joint Chiefs of Staff meeting (c. 1943). From left to right are: Gen. Henry H. Arnold, Chief of the Army Air Forces; Adm. William D. Leahy, Chief of Staff to the Commander in Chief of the Army and Navy; Adm. Ernest J. King, Commander in Chief, U.S. Fleet and Chief of Naval Operations; and Gen. George C. Marshall, Chief of Staff of the United States Army.

U.S. president Franklin D. Roosevelt and British prime minister Winston Churchill established the Combined Chiefs of Staff (CCS) during the 1942 Arcadia Conference. The CCS would serve as the supreme military body for strategic direction of the joint U.S.–UK war effort. The UK portion of the CCS would be composed of the British Chiefs of Staff Committee, but the United States had no equivalent body. The Joint Board's lack of authority made it of little use to the CCS, although its 1935 publication, Joint Action of the Army and Navy, did give some guidance for the joint operations during World War II. The Joint Board had little influence during the war and was ultimately disbanded in 1947.

As a counterpart to the UK's Chiefs of Staff Committee in the CCS, and to provide better-coordinated effort and coordinated staff work for America's military effort, Admiral William D. Leahy proposed a "unified high command" in what would come to be called the Joint Chiefs of Staff. Modeled on the British Chiefs of Staff Committee, the JCS's first formal meeting was held on 9 February 1942 to coordinate operations between the War and Navy Departments. The official history of the Army Air Forces noted that although there was "no official charter establishing this committee...by the end of February it had assumed responsibilities toward the American war effort comparable to the CCS on the combined level." On 20 July 1942, Admiral Leahy became the "Chief of Staff to the Commander in Chief", with all individual service chiefs operating under his authority.

The first members of the Joint Chiefs of Staff were:

First Joint Chiefs of Staff
Name	Service	Position
Admiral William D. Leahy	Navy	Chief of Staff to the Commander in Chief of the Army and Navy and Special Presidential Military Advisor
General George C. Marshall	Army	Chief of Staff of the United States Army (CSUSA)
Admiral Ernest J. King	Navy	Commander in Chief of the United States Fleet and Chief of Naval Operations (COMINCH-CNO)
General Henry H. 'Hap' Arnold	Army	Chief of the Army Air Forces and Deputy Chief of Staff for Air

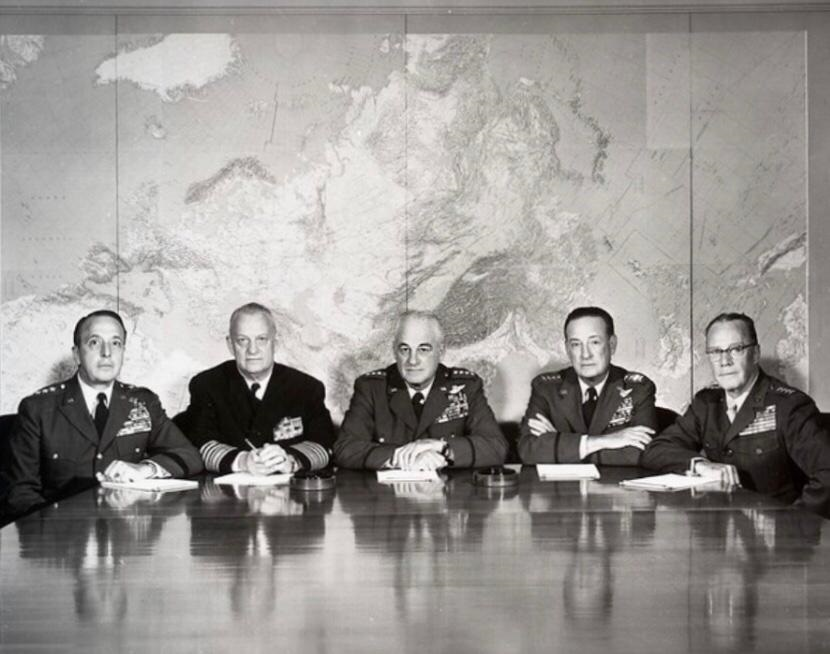
The Joint Chiefs of Staff in 1959. From left to right: Gen. Lyman L. Lemnitzer, USA; Adm. Arleigh A. Burke, USN; Gen. Nathan F. Twining, USAF (chairman); Gen. Thomas Dresser White, USAF; and Gen. Randolph M. Pate, USMC

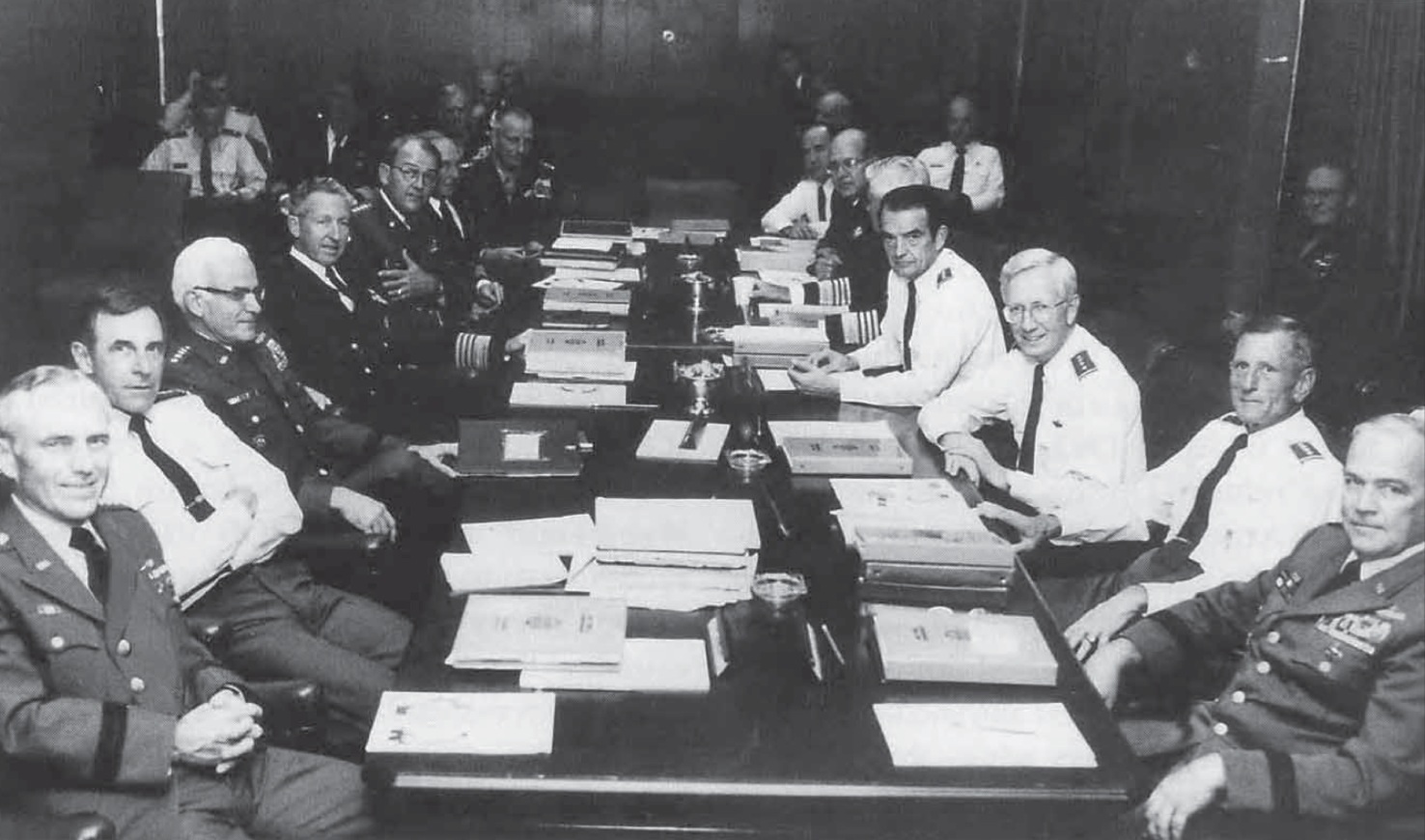
The Joint Chiefs of Staff in an annual meeting with the commanders of unified and specified command in the JCS meeting room, also known as "The Tank" on 15 January 1981.

Each of the members of the original Joint Chiefs was a four-star flag or general officer in his service branch. By the end of the war, each had been promoted: Leahy and King to fleet admiral; Marshall and Arnold to general of the Army. Arnold was later appointed to the grade of general of the Air Force.

One of the Joint Chiefs of Staff's committees was the Joint Strategic Survey Committee. This committee, "one of the most influential planning agencies in the wartime armed forces", was an extraordinary JCS committee that existed from 1942 until 1947. Members included Lieutenant General Stanley D. Embick, U.S. Army, chairman, 1942–1946, Vice Admiral Russell Willson, U.S. Navy, 1942–1945, Vice Admiral Theodore Stark Wilkinson, U.S. Navy, 1946, and Major General Muir S. Fairchild, U.S. Army Air Force, 1942–?.

=== National Security Act of 1947 ===
With the end of World War II, the Joint Chiefs of Staff were officially established under the National Security Act of 1947. Per the National Security Act, the JCS consisted of a chairman, the chief of staff of the Army, the chief of staff of the Air Force (which was established as a separate service by the same Act), and the chief of naval operations. The commandant of the Marine Corps was to be consulted on matters concerning the Corps, but was not a regular member; General Lemuel C. Shepherd, Jr., Commandant in 1952–55, was the first to sit as an occasional member. The law was amended during the term of General Louis H. Wilson, Jr. (1975–79), making the commandant a full-time JCS member in parity with the other three DoD services.

=== Goldwater–Nichols Act of 1986 ===
The position of vice chairman was created by the Goldwater–Nichols Act of 1986 to complement the chairman of the Joint Chiefs of Staff, as well as to delegate some of the chairman's responsibilities, particularly resource allocation through the Joint Requirements Oversight Council.

=== Historic appointments and firings ===
General Colin L. Powell (Chairman, 1989–1993) was the first African American to serve on the Joint Chiefs of Staff when he became the 12th Chairman of the Joint Chiefs in 1989. General Charles Q. Brown Jr., the second African American to serve as chairman, was the first African American appointed to lead a service branch when he became the Chief of Staff of the Air Force in 2020. On 25 May 2023, President Joe Biden nominated General Brown to become the 21st Chairman of the JCS. General Brown was subsequently confirmed and took up the post of chairman on 1 October 2023. Controversially, he was later terminated by President Trump's Secretary of Defense Pete Hegseth on 21 February 2025, soon after Hegseth's confirmation.

General Richard B. Myers (Chairman, 2001–2005) was the first vice chairman of the Joint Chiefs of Staff to serve as chairman of the Joint Chiefs of Staff. General Peter Pace (Vice Chairman 2001–2005; Chairman, 2005–2007) was the first Marine to serve in either position. Admiral Lisa Franchetti became the first woman to serve on the JCS when she took over as Chief of Naval Operations on 2 November 2023. Like African American JCS chairman, General Charles Q. Brown Jr., Franchetti was also fired by Hegseth on 21 February 2025. Both the firings of Chairman of the Joints Chiefs of Staff, Brown, and the Chief of Naval Operations, Franchetti, "mark[ed] the first time that two members of the Joint Chiefs of Staff had been dismissed from their senior military roles" since the creation of the Joint Chiefs of Staff in 1947.

=== National Defense Authorization Act of 2012 ===
A provision in the 2012 National Defense Authorization Act added the Chief of the National Guard Bureau to the Joint Chiefs of Staff. Guard historians called it the "most significant development" for the National Guard since the Militia Act of 1903.

=== National Defense Authorization Act of 2020 ===
The 2020 National Defense Authorization Act established the U.S. Space Force on 20 December 2019. The Space Force is headed by the chief of space operations, who reports directly to the secretary of the Air Force. Pursuant to 10 U.S.C. § 9082, the chief of space operations became a statutory member of the Joint Chiefs of Staff on 20 December 2020.

== Organization and leadership positions ==
=== Chairman ===
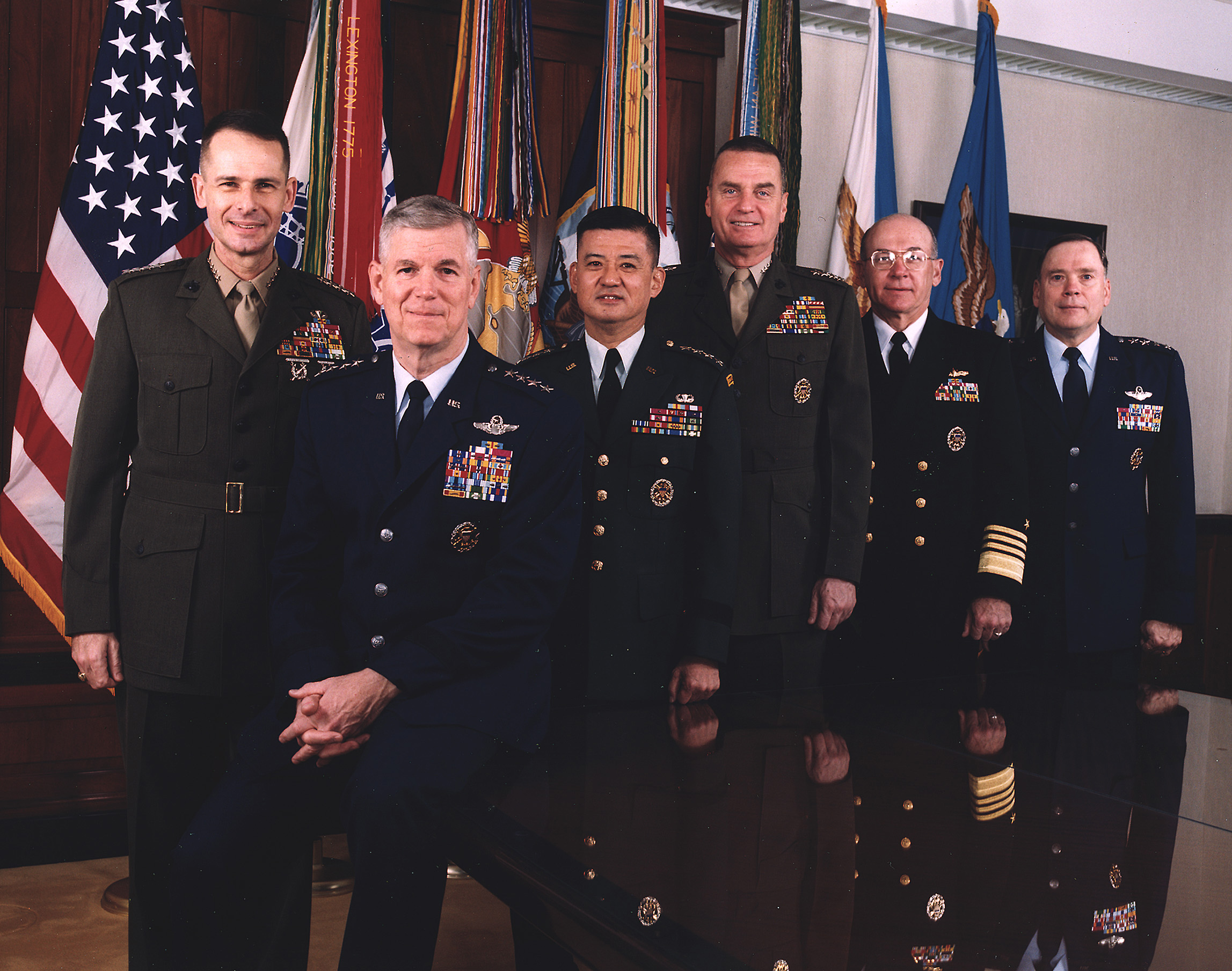
The Joint Chiefs of Staff in 2001

The chairman of the Joint Chiefs of Staff is, by law, the highest-ranking military officer of the United States Armed Forces, and the principal military adviser to the president of the United States. He leads the meetings and coordinates the efforts of the Joint Chiefs of Staff, comprising the chairman, the vice chairman of the Joint Chiefs of Staff, the chief of staff of the United States Army, the commandant of the United States Marine Corps, the chief of naval operations, the chief of staff of the United States Air Force, the Chief of Space Operations (statutory member after December 2020), and the chief of the National Guard Bureau. The Joint Chiefs of Staff have offices in the Pentagon. The chairman outranks all service chiefs, but does not maintain authority over them, their branches or the Unified Combatant Commands. All combatant commanders receive their orders directly from the secretary of defense.

On 20 July 1942, Fleet Admiral William D. Leahy became Chief of Staff to the Commander in Chief (20 July 1942 – 21 March 1949). He was not technically the chairman of the Joint Chiefs of Staff. Leahy's office was the precursor to the post of "Chairman of the Joint Chiefs of Staff". That post was established and first held by General of the Army Omar Bradley in 1949.

=== Vice Chairman ===
The position of Vice Chairman of the Joint Chiefs of Staff was created by the Goldwater–Nichols Act of 1986. The vice chairman is a four-star-general or admiral and, by law, is the second-highest-ranking member of the U.S. Armed Forces (after the chairman). In the absence of the chairman, the vice chairman presides over the meetings of the Joint Chiefs of Staff. He may also perform such duties as the chairman may prescribe. It was not until the National Defense Authorization Act in 1992 that the position was made a full voting member of the JCS. The current vice chairman is General Christopher J. Mahoney, who began his tenure on 1 October 2025.

=== Senior Enlisted Advisor to the Chairman ===
The senior enlisted advisor to the chairman of the Joint Chiefs of Staff (SEAC) advises on all matters concerning joint and combined total force integration, utilization, development, and helps develop noncommissioned officers related to joint professional education, enhances utilization of senior NCOs on joint battle staffs, and supports the chairman's responsibilities as directed.

Command Sergeant Major William Gainey was the first SEAC, serving from 1 October 2005. The current SEAC is David Isom, who was sworn in on 20 June 2025, replacing former SEAC Troy E. Black.

== Joint Staff ==
Joint Staff
- Office of the Joint Chiefs of Staff identification badge

Agency overview
- Formed: 1949
- Headquarters: The Pentagon
- Employees: Approx. 1,500
- Agency executive: VADM Paul Spedero Jr., Director of the Joint Staff
- Parent agency: Department of Defense

The Joint Staff is a military headquarters staff based at the Pentagon (with offices in Hampton Roads, Virginia; Fort Leavenworth, Kansas; Lackland Air Force Base, Texas; Fort Belvoir, Virginia; Fairchild Air Force Base, Washington and Fort McNair, District of Columbia) composed of personnel from all the six armed services, assisting the chairman and the vice chairman in discharging their responsibilities. They work closely with the Office of the Secretary of Defense (OSD), the military department staffs, and the combatant command staffs.

The chairman of the Joint Chiefs of Staff is assisted by the director of the Joint Staff, a three-star officer who assists the chairman with the management of the Joint Staff, an organization composed of approximately equal numbers of officers contributed by the Army, the Navy and Marine Corps, the Air Force, the Space Force, and the Coast Guard, who have been assigned to assist the chairman in providing to the secretary of defense unified strategic direction, operation, and integration of the combatant land, naval, space, and air forces. The director is assisted by the vice director of the Joint Staff, a two-star officer.

Former secretary of defense Mark Esper tasked the Joint Staff with developing a Joint Warfighting Concept (Note: JADC2 as a concept— Like the Integrated Tactical Network, instances of a concept can exist before acquisition— see PEO C3T (2018) Integrated Tactical Network) for the services by December 2020. Developing Joint all-domain command and control (JADC2) as a concept is a key goal of the 20th Chief of the joint Chiefs of Staff. An OSD/Joint Staff Cross-Functional Team for JADC2 is underway. Esper ordered the four services and the Joint Staff to create a new joint warfighting concept for All-domain operations, operating simultaneously in the air, land, sea, space, cyber, and the electromagnetic spectrum. The Joint Chiefs and Combatant Commanders witnessed demonstrations of the concept in September 2020.

=== Directorates of the Joint Staff ===
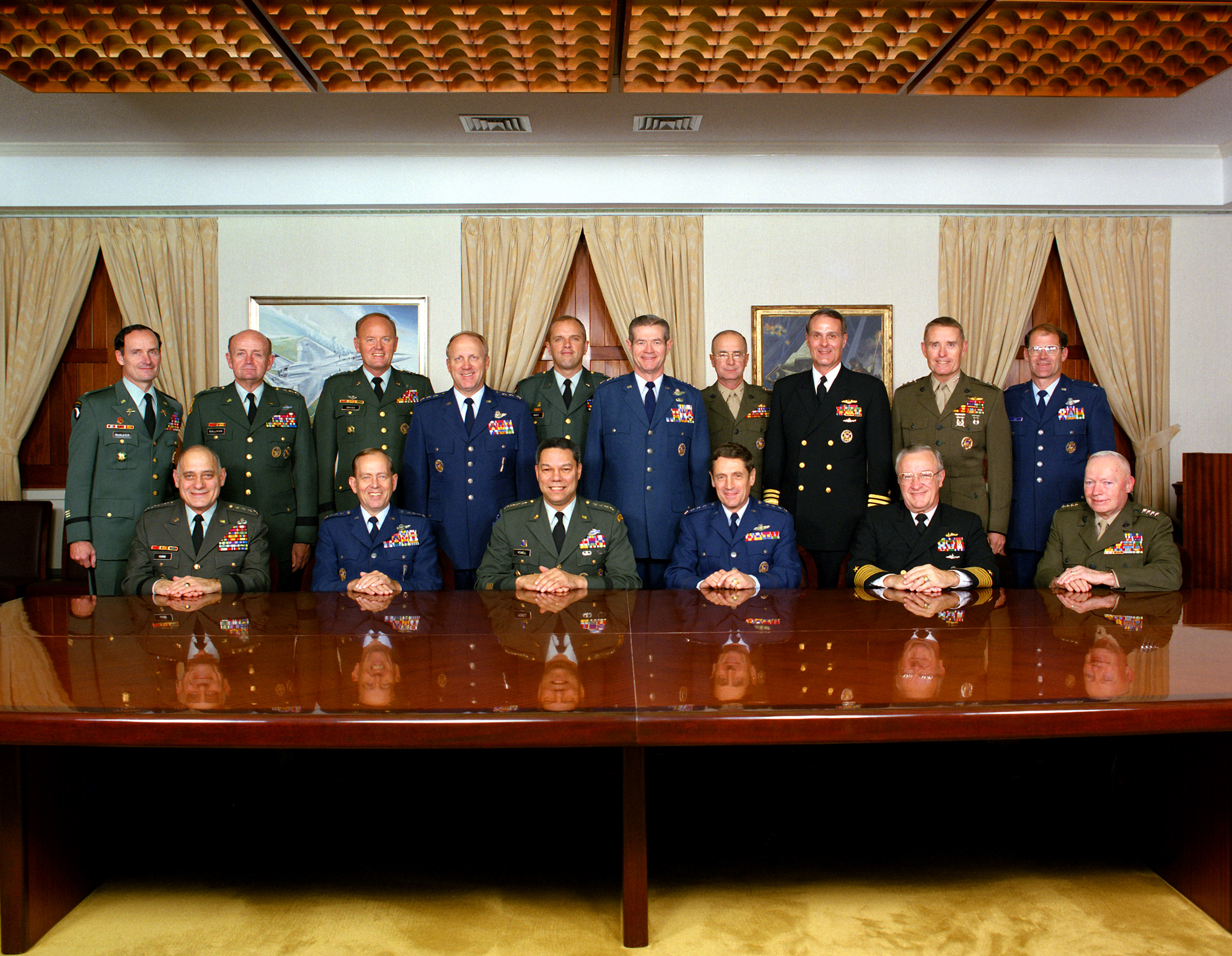
The Joint Chiefs of Staff (seated) and the directors of the Joint Staff directorates (standing), November 1989.

The Joint Staff includes the following departments, where all the planning, policies, intelligence, manpower, communications, and logistics functions are translated into action.

- DOM – Directorate of Management
  - Joint Secretariat
    - Information Management Division
    - Actions Division
- J1 – Personnel and Manpower
- J2 – Intelligence
  - The National Military Joint Intelligence Center (NMJIC) is part of the J2 directorate and is staffed by Defense Intelligence Agency personnel
- J3 – Operations
  - Responsible for military operations. The third level of the US National Level Command Structure, primarily assisting the Chairman of the Joint Chiefs of Staff in carrying out responsibilities as the principal military advisor to the President and Secretary of Defense. Operations develops and provides guidance to the Combatant Commanders; relays communications between the President, Secretary of Defense, Combatant Commanders regarding current operations and plans. It is headed by the Director, Operations, a three-star lieutenant general or vice admiral.
  - The National Military Command Center (NMCC) is part of the J3 directorate
- J4 – Logistics
- J5 – Strategic Plans and Policy
- J6 – Command, Control, Communications and Computers/Cyber
  - The J-6 directorate is one of a group of agencies that administer the SIPRNet. Other administrators include: the National Security Agency, the Defense Intelligence Agency, and the Defense Information Systems Agency. The J-6 chairs the DOD's Military Command, Control, Communications, and Computers Executive Board (MC4EB) which works in conjunction with the multinational Combined Communications-Electronics Board.
  - The J-6 Joint Deployable Analysis Team conducts assessments in conjunction with Combatant Command exercises, experiments, and test and evaluation events.
- J7 – Joint Force Development
  - The J-7 is responsible for the six functions of joint force development: Doctrine, Education, Concept Development & Experimentation, Training, Exercises, and Lessons Learned.
- J8 – Force Structure, Resources, and Assessment

== Civilian awards ==
The Joint Chiefs may recognize private citizens, organizations or career civilian government employees for significant achievements provided to the joint community with one of the following decorations/awards.

- Distinguished Public Service Medal
- Outstanding Public Service Medal
- Joint Distinguished Civilian Service Medal
- Joint Meritorious Civilian Service Medal
- Joint Civilian Service Commendation Medal
- Joint Civilian Service Achievement Medal

== Coast Guard ==
Although, as discussed above, the commandant of the Coast Guard is not an ex officio member of the JCS like the other service chiefs, Coast Guard officers are legally eligible to be appointed as Chairman and Vice Chairman, pursuant to 10 U.S.C. § 152(a)(1) and 10 U.S.C. § 154(a)(1) respectively, which use the collective term "armed forces" rather than listing the eligible services, as well as to other positions on the Joint Staff. As of 2025, no Coast Guard officer has been appointed Chairman or Vice Chairman, but Coast Guard officers routinely serve on the JCS staff, including one vice admiral who was appointed to serve as J6 in 2016.

== Gallery ==
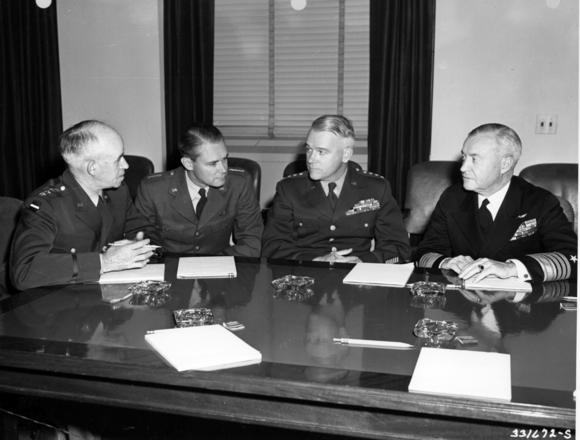
The Joint Chiefs of Staff during its early days in 1949.

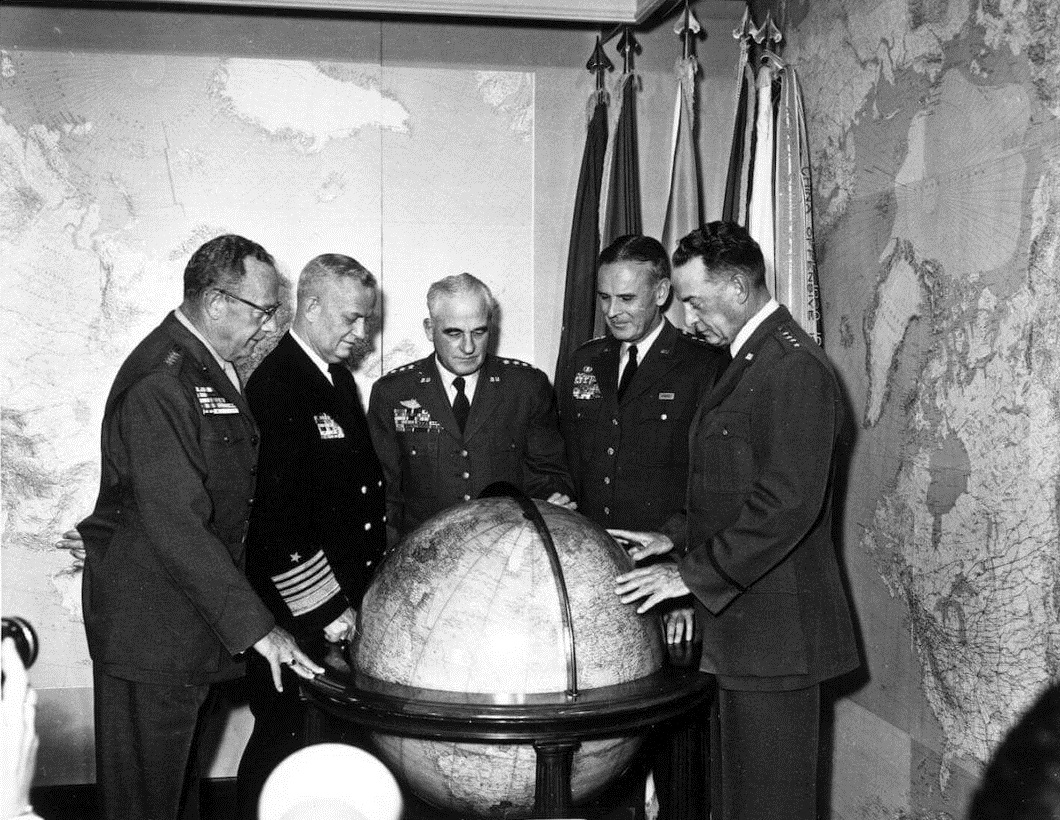
Members of the Joint Chiefs of Staff at The Pentagon in 1958.

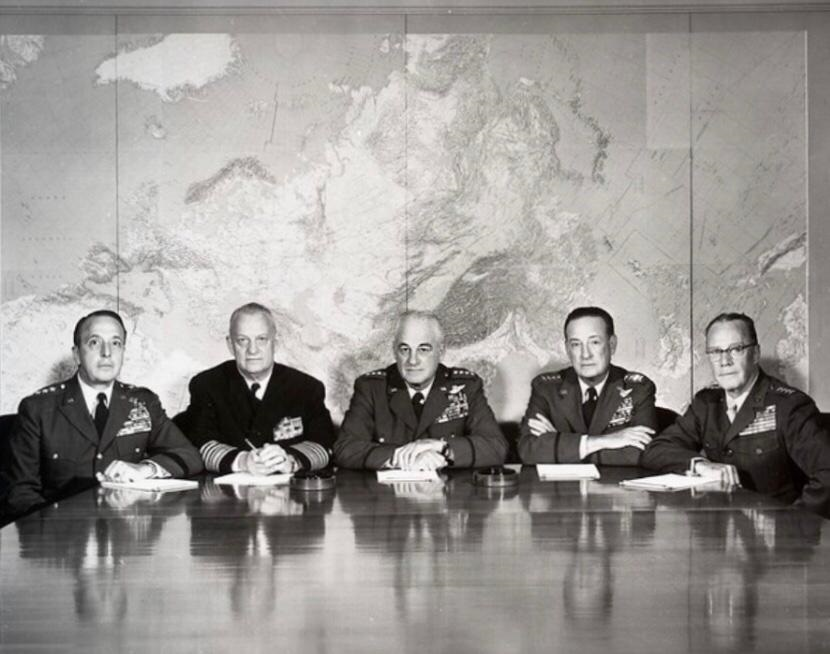
The Joint Chiefs of Staff in 1959.

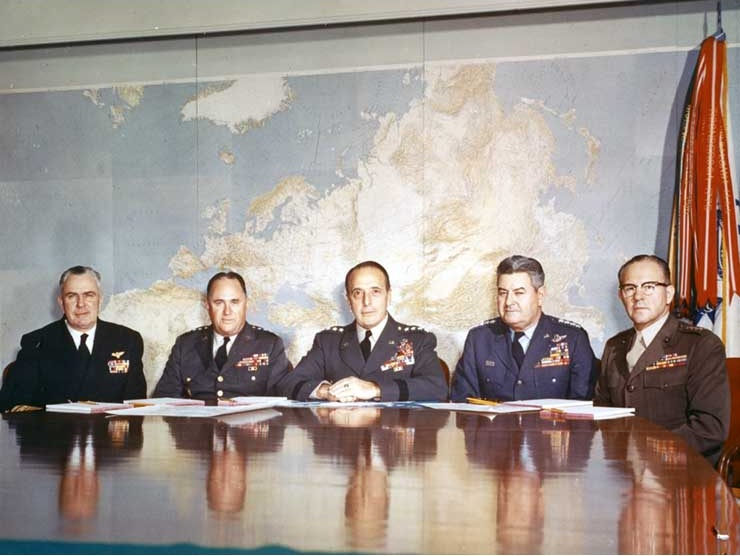
The Joint Chiefs of Staff in 1961.

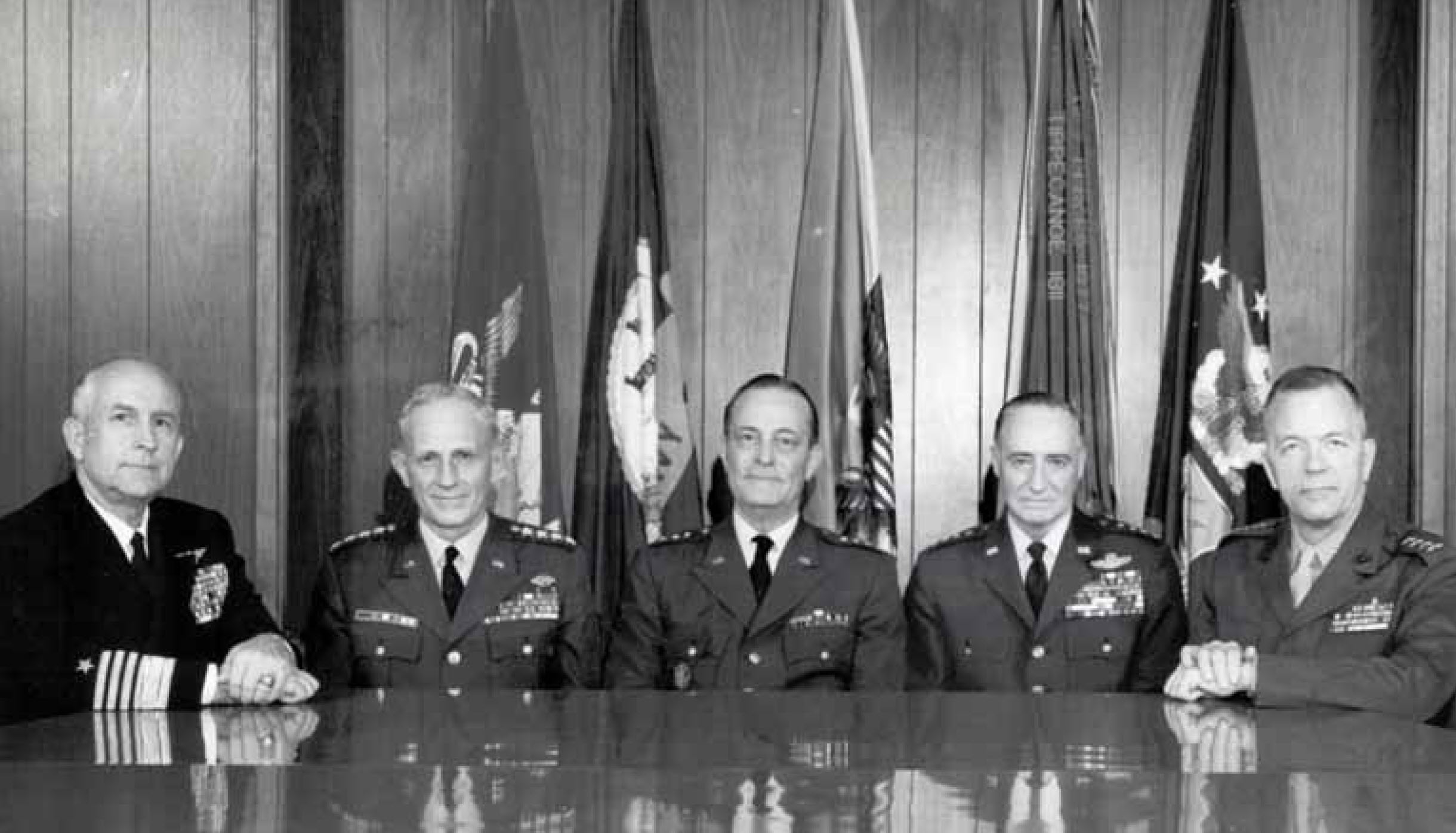
The Joint Chiefs of Staff in 1968.

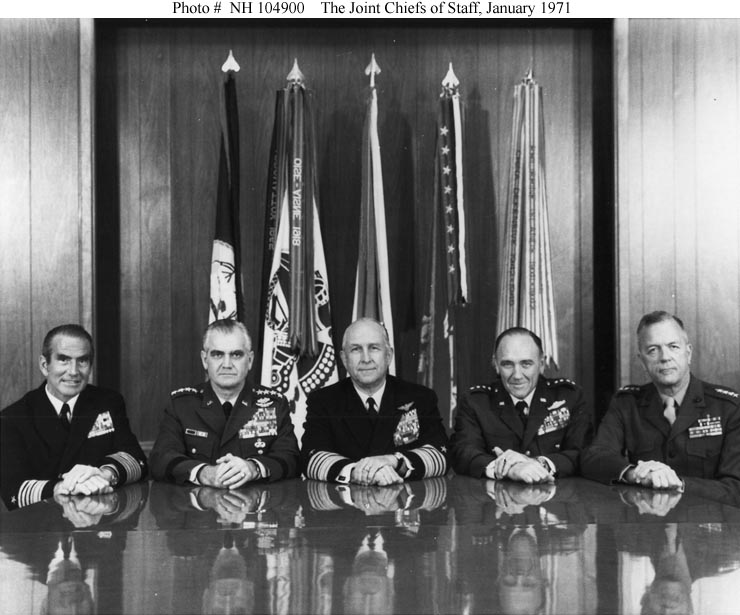
The Joint Chiefs of Staff in 1971.

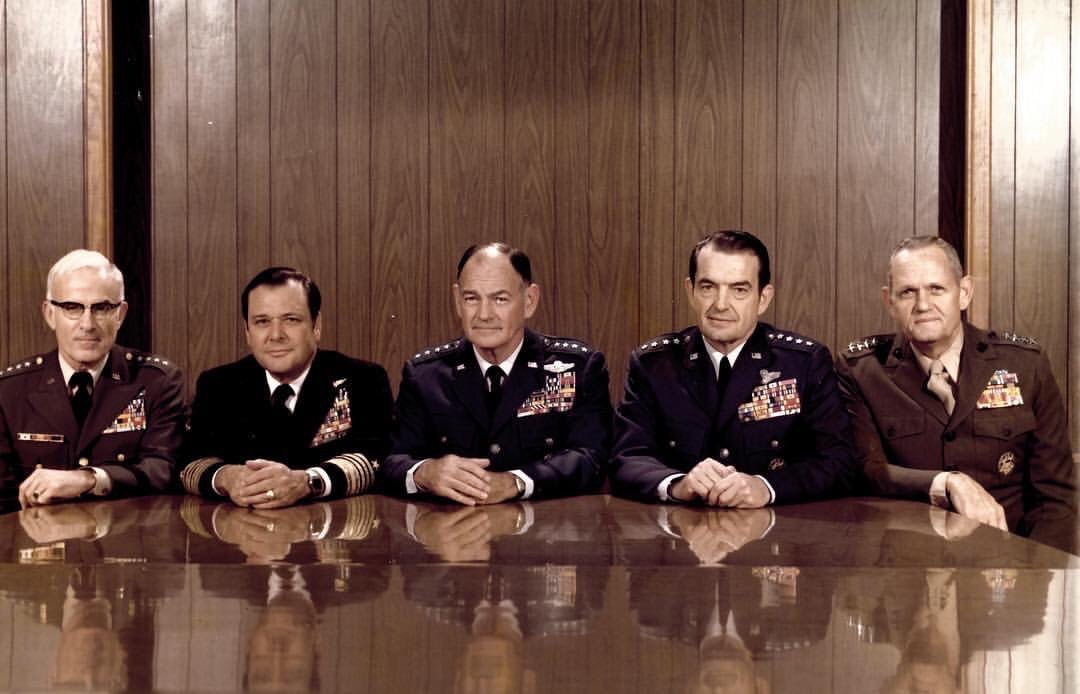
The Joint Chiefs of Staff in 1977.

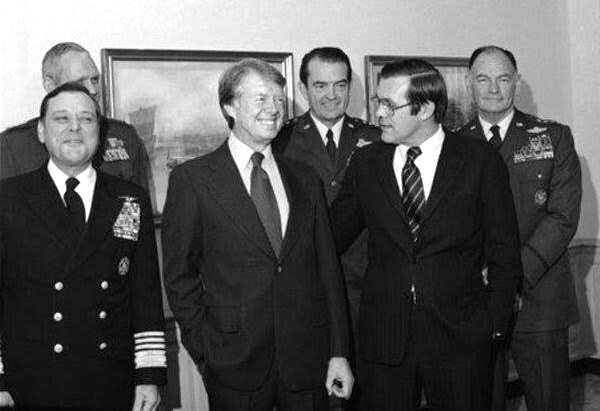
Members of the Joint Chiefs of Staff with President-Elect Jimmy Carter and Secretary of Defense Donald Rumsfeld on December 17, 1976.

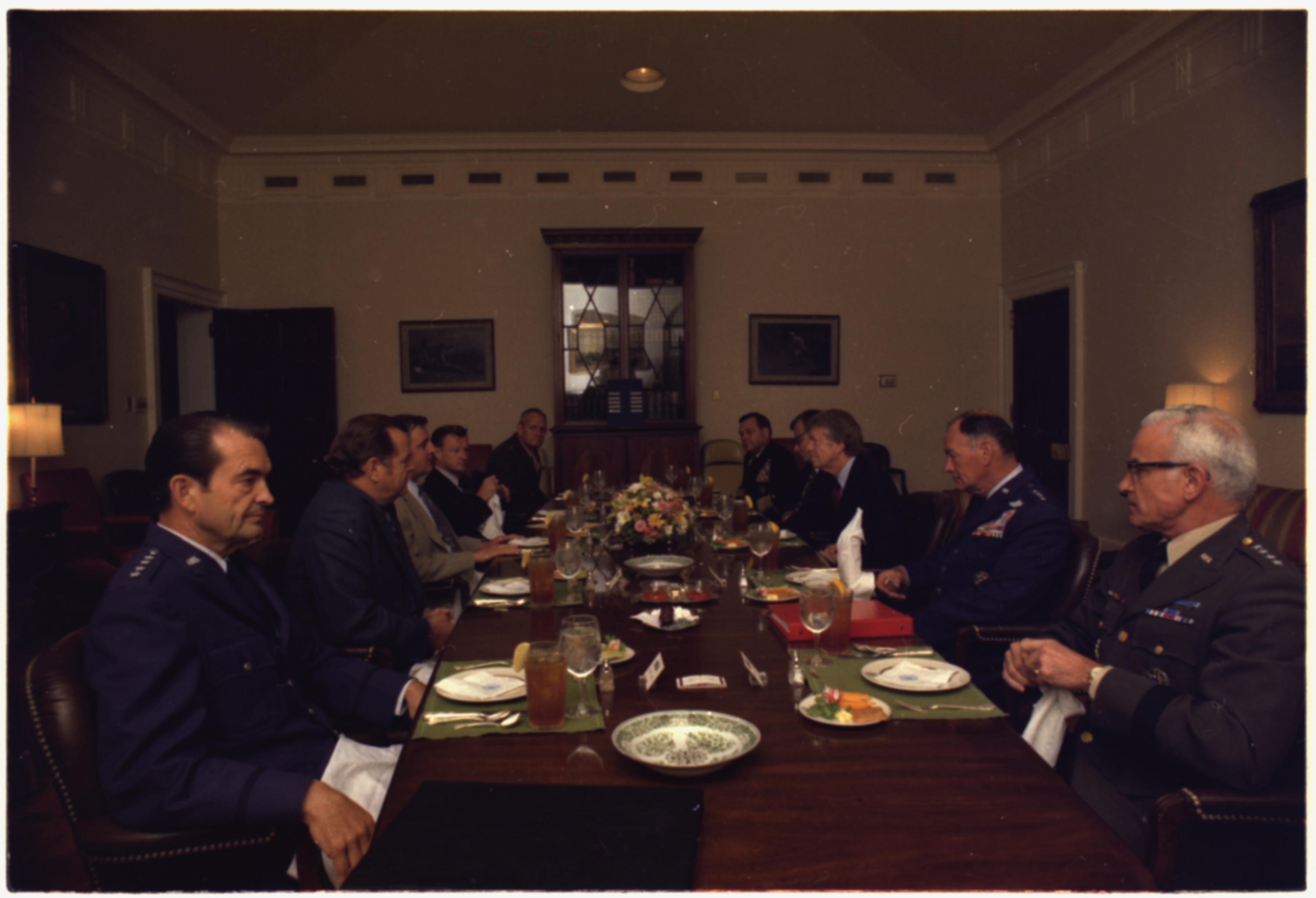
Members of the Joint Chiefs of Staff during a cabinet meeting in the White House in 1977

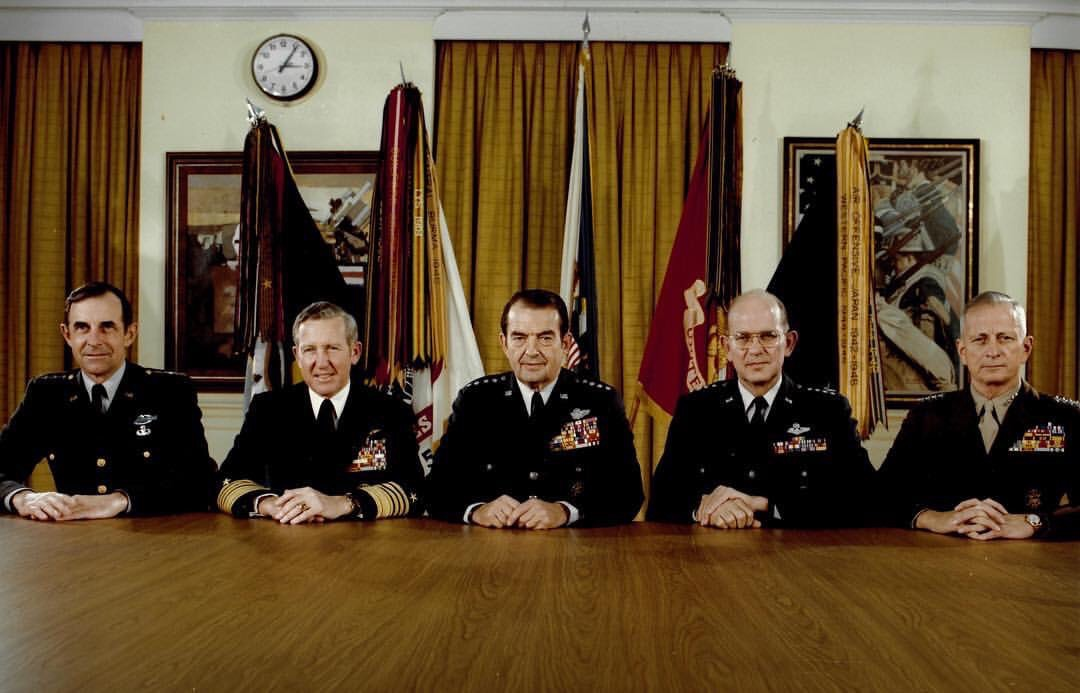
The Joint Chiefs of Staff in 1981.

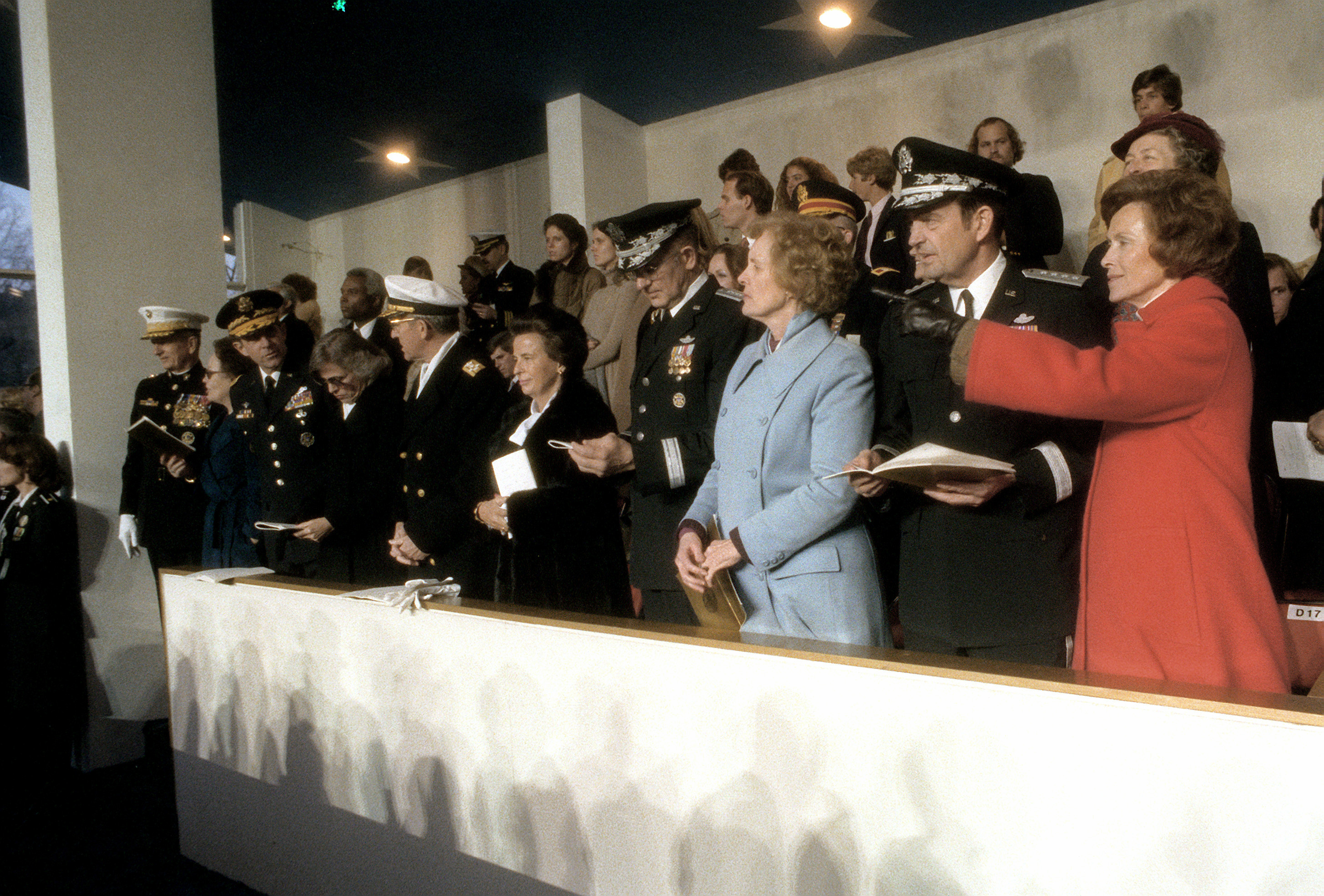
Members of the Joint Chiefs of Staff during President Ronald Reagan Inaugural Parade on January 20, 1981.

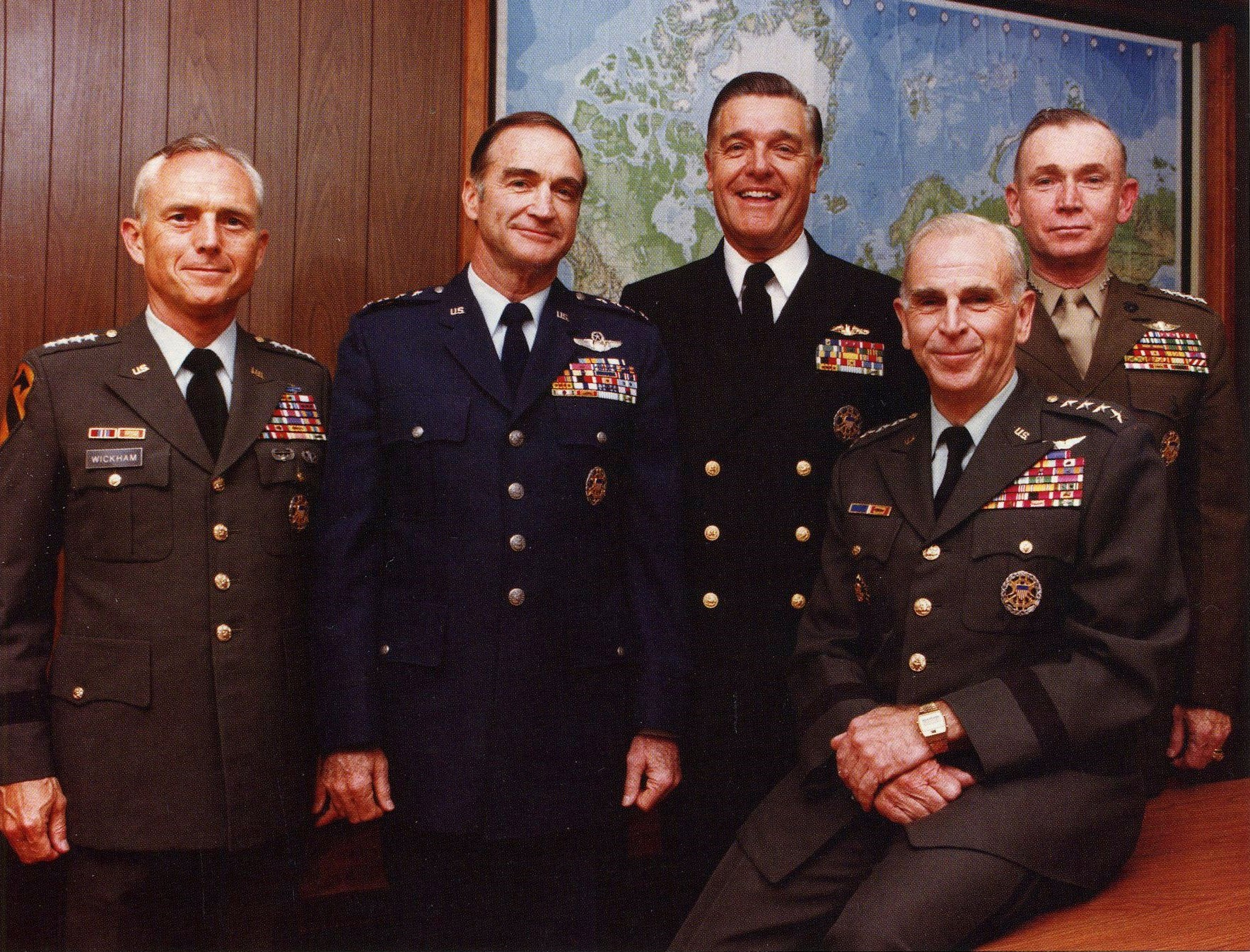
The Joint Chiefs of Staff in 1983.

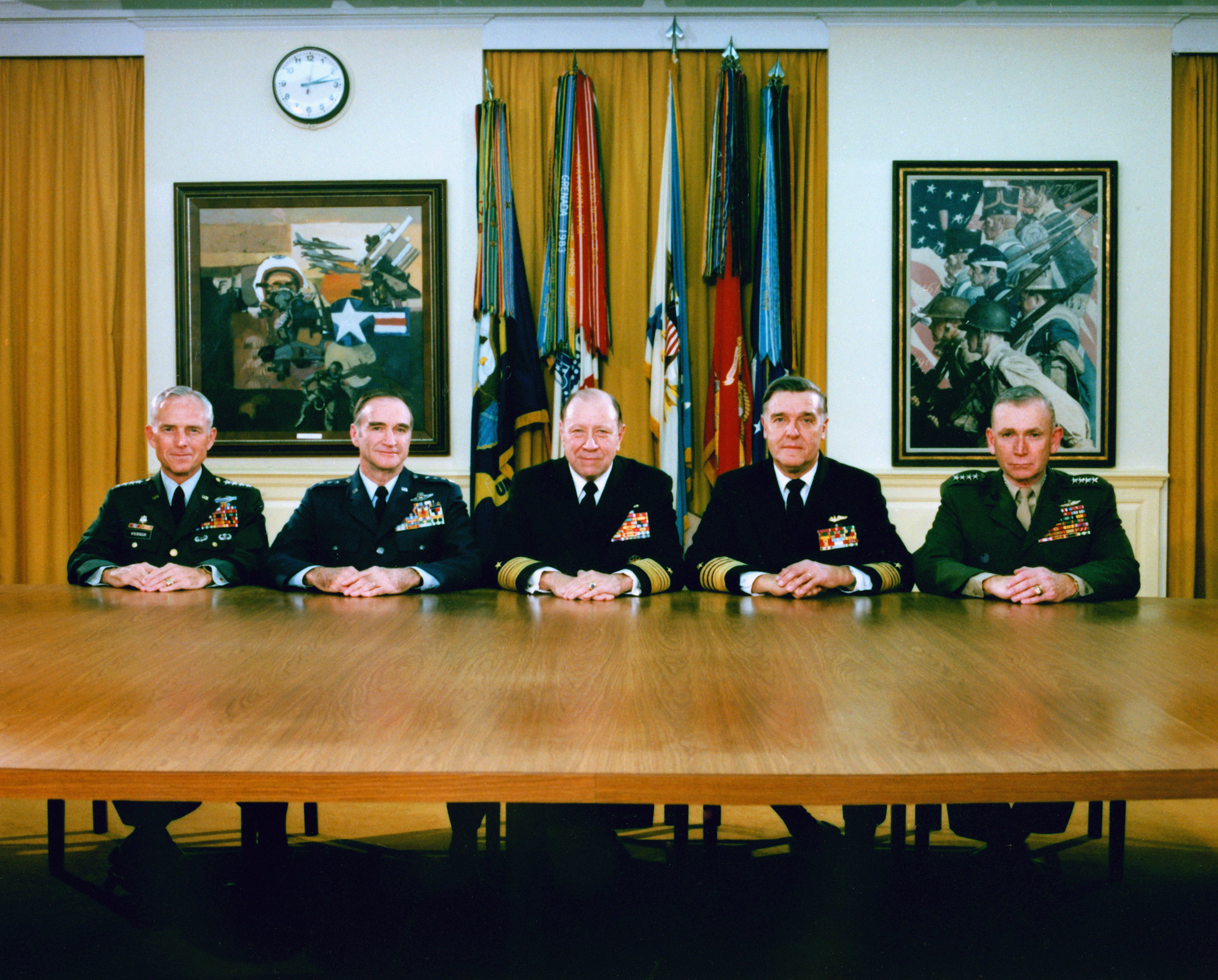
The Joint Chiefs of Staff in 1986.

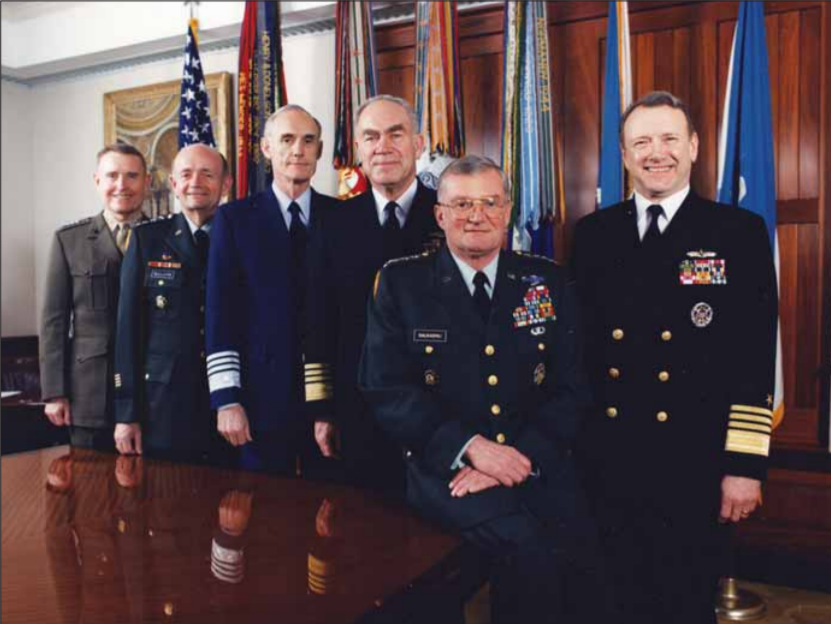
The Joint Chiefs of Staff in 1994.

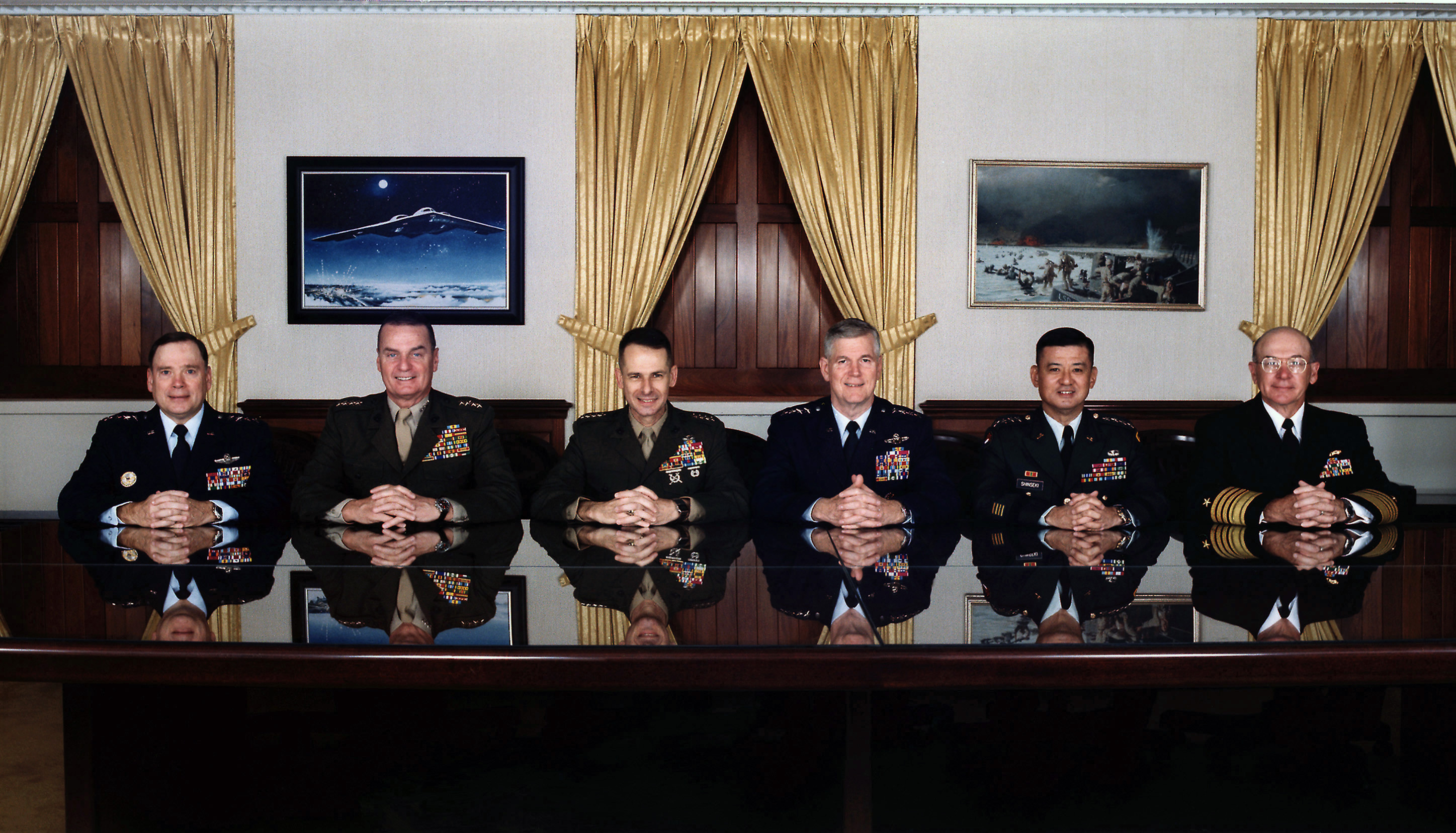
The Joint Chiefs of Staff in 2001.

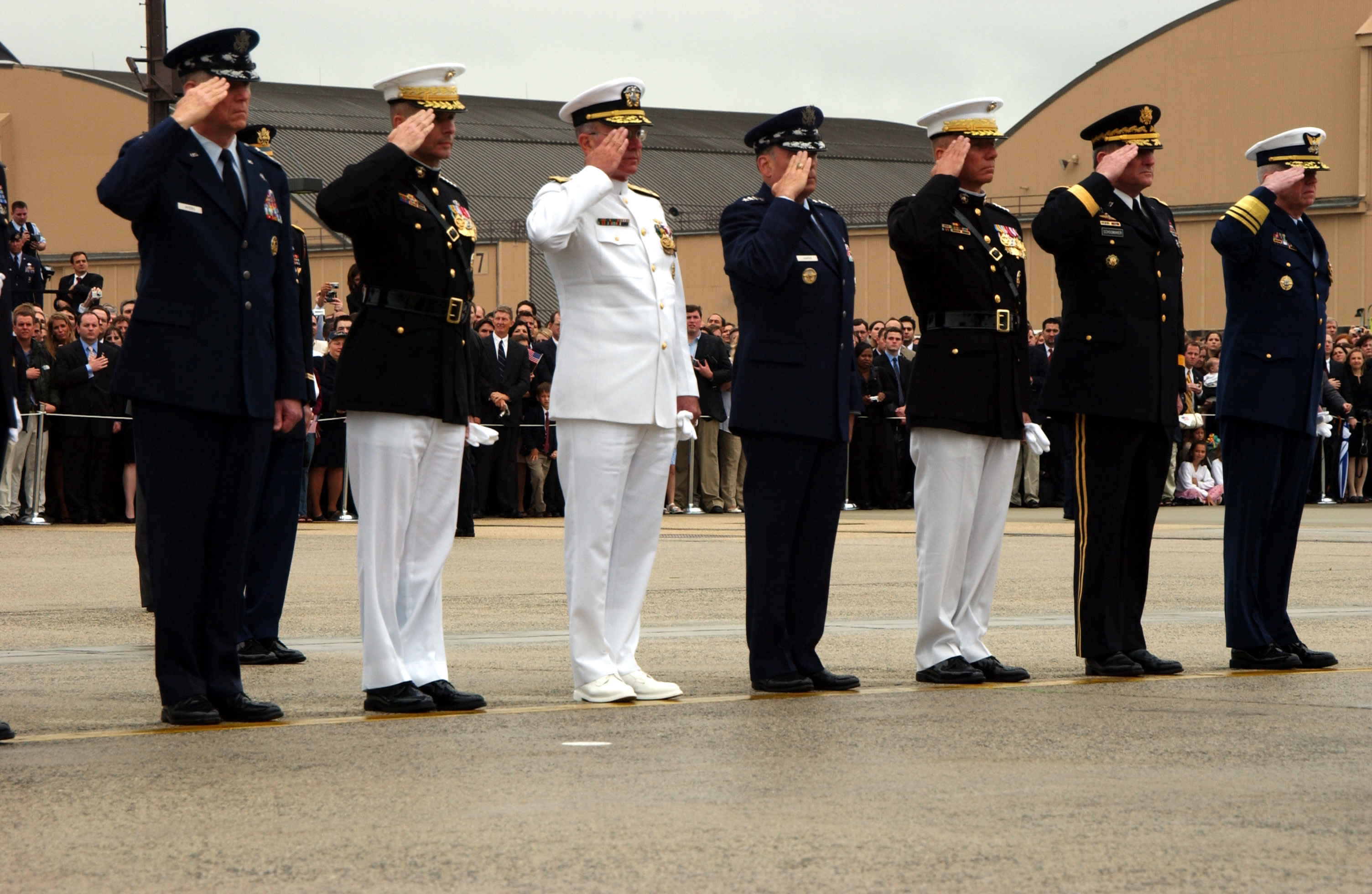
Members of the Joint Chiefs of Staff render a salute for the late President Ronald Reagan at Andrews Air Force Base in 2004.

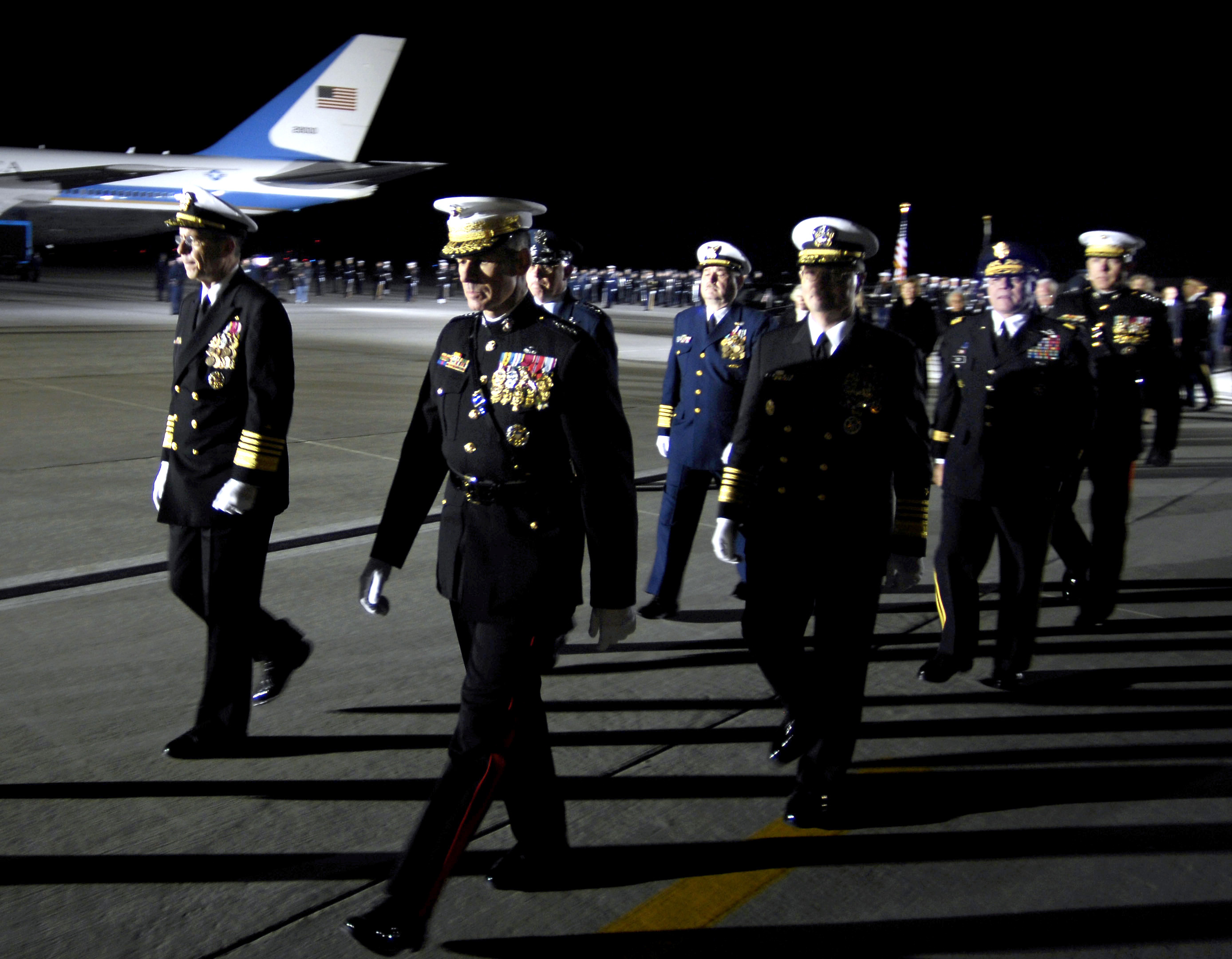
Members of the Joint Chiefs of Staff at Andrews Air Force Base during a funeral service ceremony for the late President Gerald Ford on 26 December 2006.

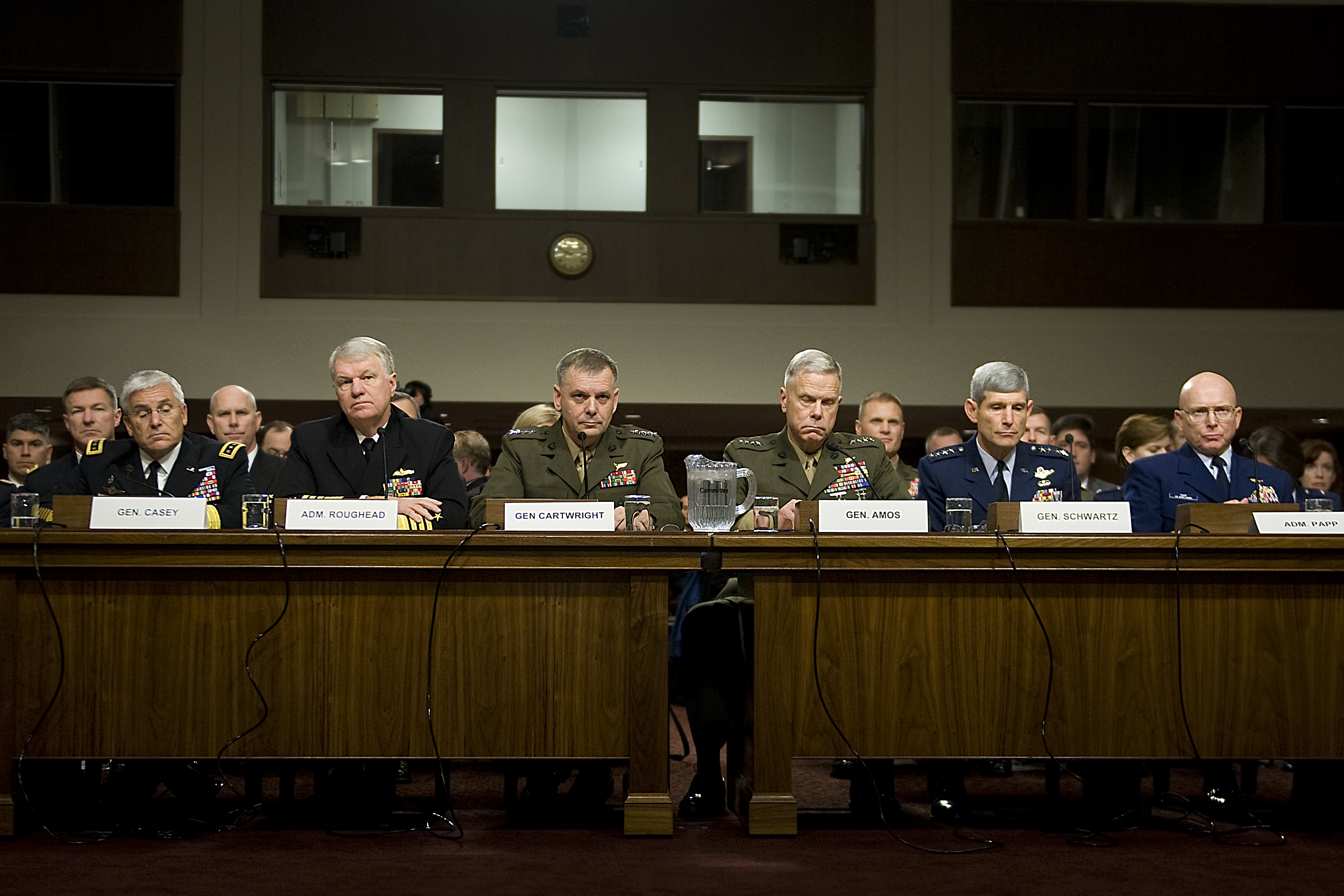
The Joint Chiefs of Staff at the Senate Armed Services Committee testimony in The Capitol Hill 2010.

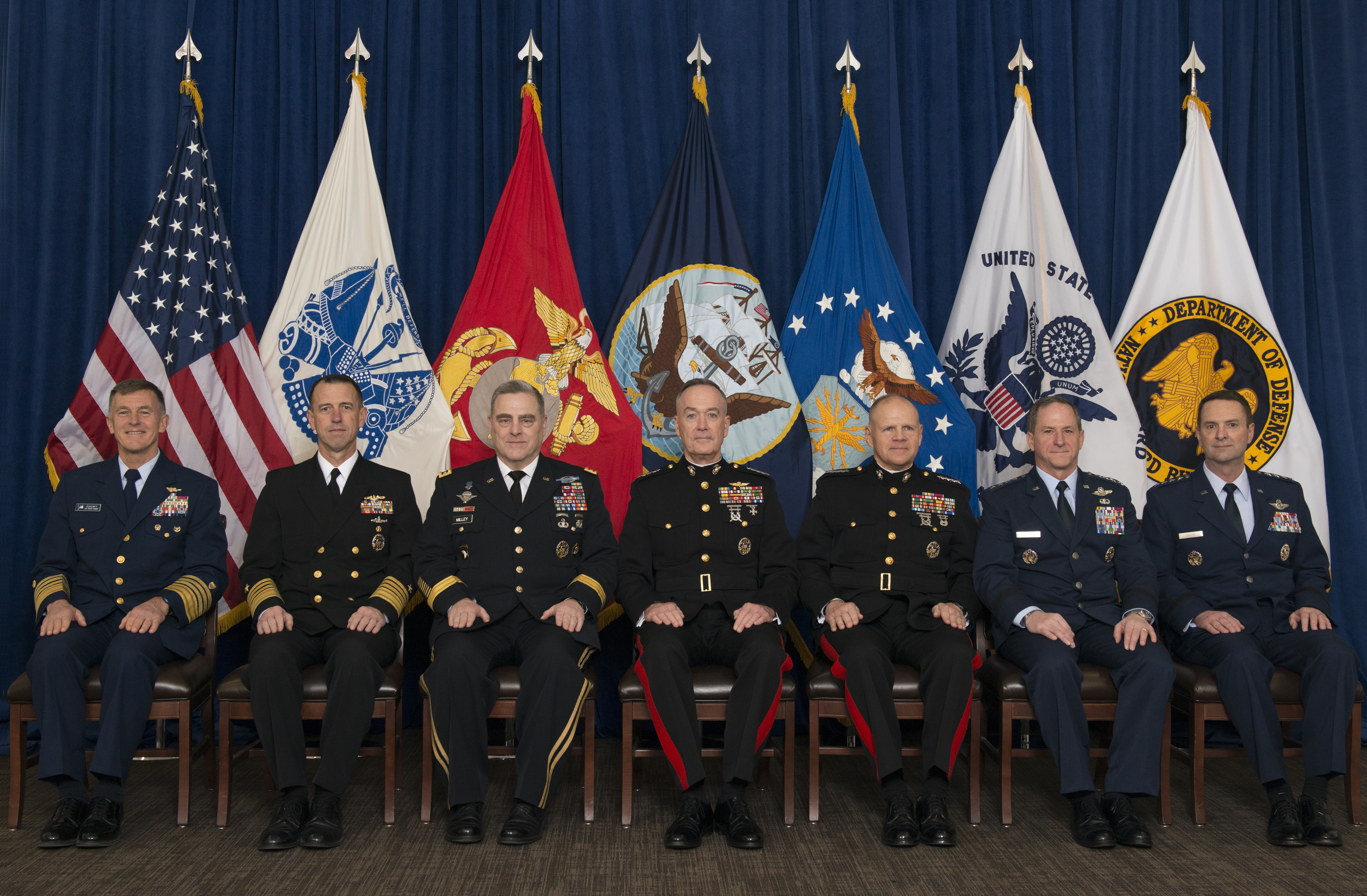
The Joint Chiefs of Staff in 2017.

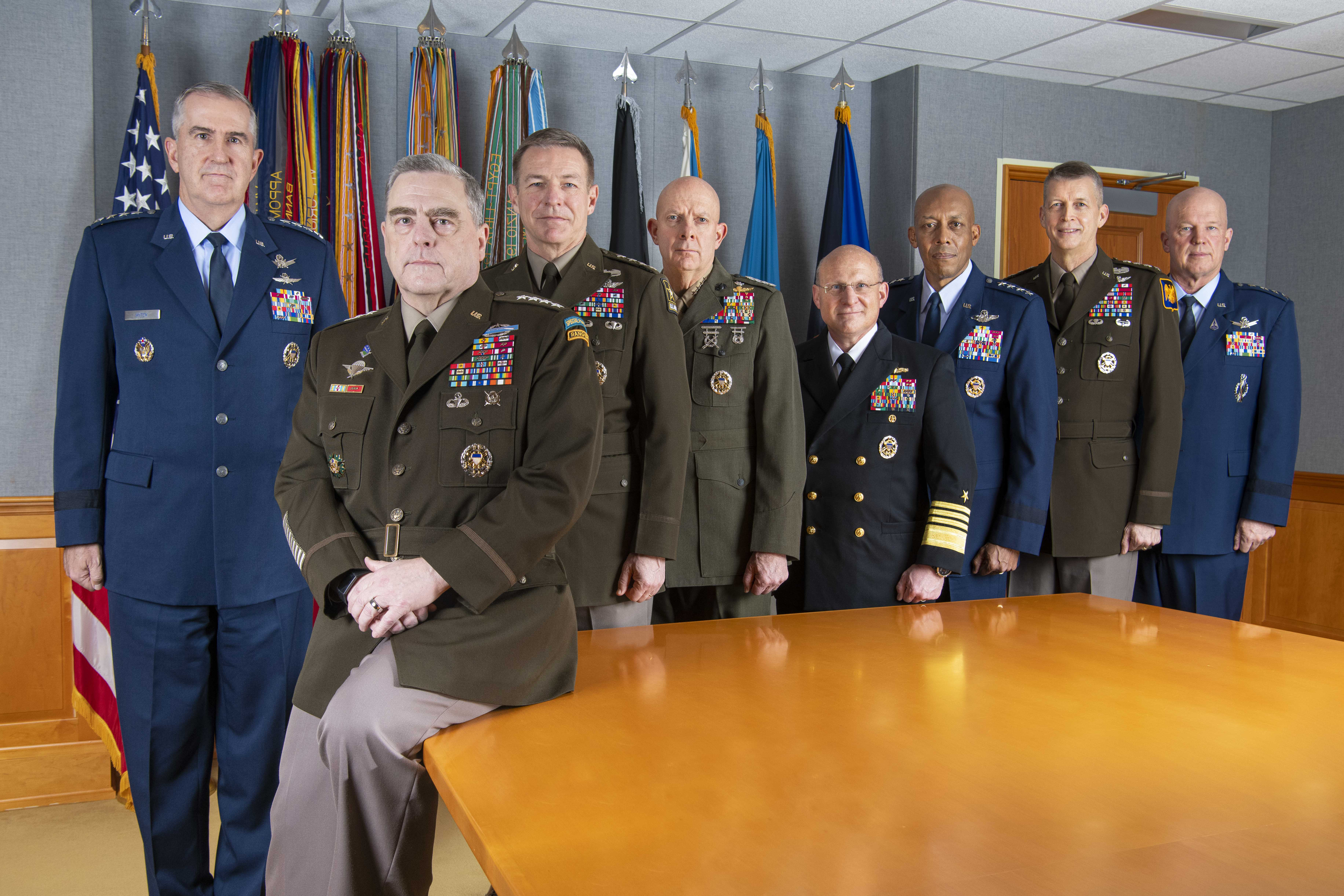
The Joint Chiefs of Staff in 2020.

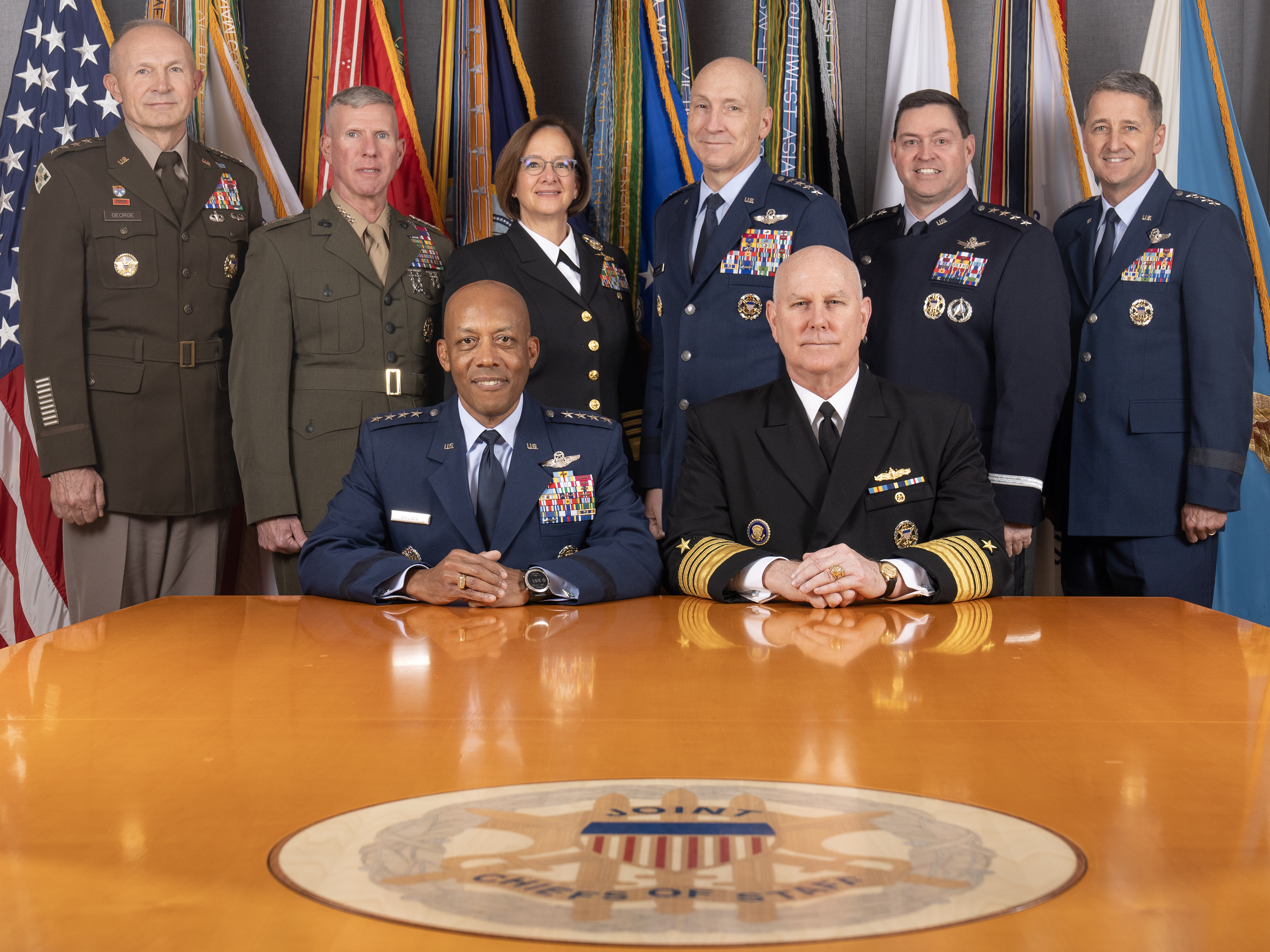
The Joint Chiefs of Staff in November 2024.

== See also ==
- Chief of the Defence Force (Australia)
- Armed Forces Council (Canada)
- Chief of Defence Force (New Zealand)
- Chiefs of Staff Committee (United Kingdom)
- General Staff of the Armed Forces of the Russian Federation
- Joint Staff Department of the Central Military Commission (China)
- General Staff of the Israel Defense Forces
- Chief of Staff, Joint Staff (Japan)
- Joint Chiefs of Staff (South Korea)
- Chief of Defence Staff (India)
- Staff (military) – see Modern United States military usage for organization of Joint Staff (J1 through J8)
