= Joint Staff Information Management Division (United States) =

One of two divisions which make up the U.S. Joint Staff Secretariat

The Joint Staff Information Management Division (IMD) is one of two divisions which make up the Joint Staff Secretariat (SJS) of the United States Joint Chiefs of Staff currently located in the Pentagon in Arlington, Virginia (USA). The other division is called Actions Division (AD) which manages the daily workflow of the staff.

Mission: To support the Chairman of the Joint Chiefs of Staff by providing information management services that include Joint Staff and Combatant Command records management policy and oversight; forms, directives, and NATO document management; staff action research, archiving, and content management; mandatory and automatic declassification and security reviews; and Freedom of Information Act (FOIA) request processing.

Information Management Division has approximately thirty personnel divided into two branches: the Records, Research and Content Branch (RRCB), and the Declassification Branch (DB). The division chief position is held by a Department of Defense civil servant of GS-15 pay grade. The division also has a military officer as a deputy with the rank of O-5, but all other personnel are civilians, a mix of federal and contract workers. The SJS falls within the Joint Staff's Directorate of Management (DOM) headed by an officer of two-star flag rank.

== Records, Research and Content Branch ==
This branch maintains the corporate archive of record of the top five general officers of the Joint Staff: The Chairman (CJCS), the Assistant to the chairman, the Vice Chairman (VCJCS), the Director (DJS), and Vice Director (VDJS). They are referred to collectively as the "Top Five." The VDJS is dual hatted as the Director of Management of the Joint Staff. The records maintained within this archive are available for Action Officers (AOs) on the Joint Staff to conduct research as a part of processing current business actions on the staff. They are also available for the Joint Staff History Office to prepare official historical accounts of the actions of the Joint Staff. An electronic searchable archive of these actions is maintained within internal staff electronic servers for AO convenience, although the actual record copy of all actions is maintained as a paper file.

Additionally, this branch is charged by the Department of Defense Chief Information Officer with records management oversight responsibility for the offices of the Top Five, all the staff's directorates, and, on behalf of the CJCS, with oversight of the Records Management Program (RMP) of all combatant commands. These commands include: US Central Command (USCENTCOM), US Southern Command (USSOUTHCOM), US Special Operations Command (USSOCOM), US Transportation Command (USTRANSCOM), US Strategic Command (USSTRATCOM), United States Pacific Command (USPACOM), US European Command (USEUCOM), and the new US Africa Command (USAFRICOM) which achieved full-fledged Unified Combatant Command status in October 2008.

Official records of the Joint Staff and combatant commands are managed in accordance with internally developed policy and procedures using a disposition schedule which has been approved by the Archivist of the United States—which makes it law, in effect. Records are managed by the Joint Staff or originating combatant command's records officer throughout their lifecycle until the disposition schedule calls for them to be accessioned to the National Archives and Records Administration (NARA), at which time NARA assumes physical and legal custody of those records which have been deemed permanent.

Also, the Records, Research and Content Branch is responsible for Enterprise Content Management policy for the Joint Staff.

Finally, the RRC Branch maintains the system of directives for the Joint Staff. It also maintains an official repository of NATO documents for staff reference.

== Declassification Branch ==
This branch processes Freedom of Information Act (FOIA) requests and conducts declassification review of Joint Staff records as part of the Automatic Declassification requirements mandated by Executive Order 12958 as amended. The branch conducts Mandatory Declassification Reviews (MDRs) when required outside of FOIA, as well as Security Reviews of scholarly works with potential Joint Staff classified equities written by DOD members for publication or for educational purposes. Members of the public who wish access to Joint Staff records must make their requests via the DOD's Freedom of Information Office. This group of government and contract civilians works to insure the public has access to Joint Staff unclassified information as an informed (and supportive) polity is critical for successful democratic government. The Declassification Branch is also bound to protect classified information to protect the security interests of the country and its citizens both at home and abroad, whether they be civilian or military.

== See also ==
- Information Security Oversight Office
- Public Interest Declassification Board
