= Joint Distinguished Civilian Service Medal =

United States civil award

Joint Distinguished Civilian Service Metal
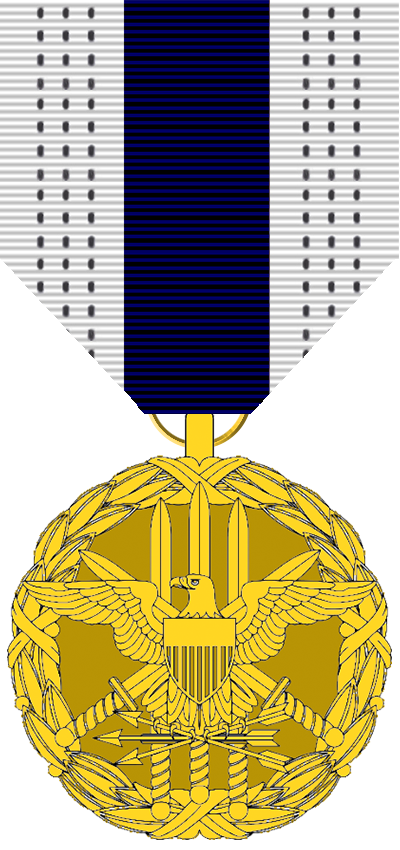
- Type: Career award
- Awarded for: Noteworthy or superlative contributions that far exceeds the contributions and service of others with comparable responsibilities
- Country: United States
- Presented by: Chairman of the Joint Chiefs of Staff
- Eligibility: Career civilian employees of the federal government
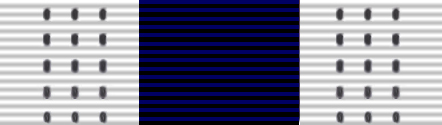
- Ribbon

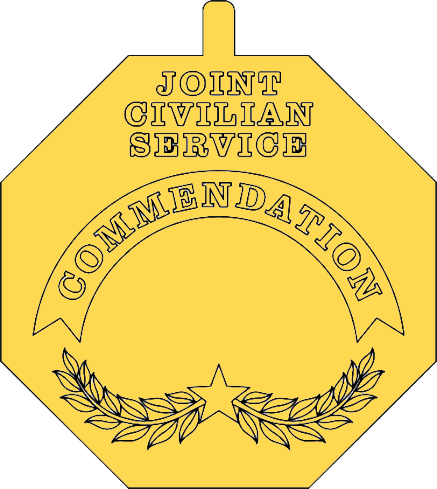
- Reverse

Precedence
- Next (higher): Chairman of the Joint Chiefs of Staff Award for Outstanding Public Service
- Next (lower): Joint Meritorious Civilian Service Medal

The Joint Distinguished Civilian Service Medal (formerly the Joint Distinguished Civilian Service Award) is the highest civilian service award of the U.S. Chairman of the Joint Chiefs of Staff (CJCS).

== Eligibility ==
This award is granted to any civilian employee of the Joint Staff, combatant commands, joint organizations reporting to or through the CJCS, or any other employee designated by the CJCS for service that exceeds the contributions and service of others with comparable responsibilities. The level of service for this award should have been given the direct attention or led to direct interaction with the CJCS.

Recipients may receive the award only once, and the award cannot be received in conjunction with a Secretary of Defense award for the same service. Time in service is not necessarily a qualifying factor and military service should not be factored at all.

== Description ==
The award is a gold-plated medal with the Department of Defense seal (eagle clutching arrows with an American shield in foreground) in front of two crossed swords and two vertical swords. The medal is suspended from a white ribbon with a wide purple center stripe and six dashed pin stripes, three on each side.
