= Admiral Strauss =

Admiral Strauss may refer to:

- Elliott B. Strauss (1903–2003), U.S. Navy rear admiral
- Joseph Strauss (admiral) (1861–1948), U.S. Navy admiral
- Lewis Strauss (1896–1974), U.S. Navy rear admiral
