= Donald Ensenat =

American diplomat (born 1946)

Donald Burnham Ensenat
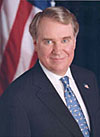

28th Chief of Protocol of the United States
- In office June 6, 2001 – February 18, 2007
- President: George W. Bush
- Preceded by: Mary Mel French
- Succeeded by: Nancy Brinker

United States Ambassador to Brunei
- In office August 11, 1992 – June 13, 1993
- President: George H. W. Bush; Bill Clinton
- Preceded by: Christopher H. Phillips
- Succeeded by: Theresa Anne Tull

Personal details
- Born: February 4, 1946 (age 80)
- Party: Republican
- Education: Yale University (BA); Tulane University (JD)

Donald Burnham Ensenat (born February 4, 1946) is a retired American diplomat. Until his retirement in 2007, he served as United States Chief of Protocol at the United States Department of State.

== Personal ==
Ensenat is a native of New Orleans, Louisiana. He is a graduate of the Isidore Newman School in New Orleans, Yale University, and the Tulane University Law School. As an undergraduate, he was a roommate of George W. Bush at Yale College. In the 1960s and 1970s, Ensenat served as a military reservist.

== Career ==
Ensenat is a lawyer, and formerly served as Ambassador to Brunei.

Diplomatic posts
Preceded by Christopher H. Phillips	United States Ambassador to Brunei; 1992–1993	Succeeded by Theresa Anne Tull
