= Brunei–United States relations =

- Brunei: United States

Diplomatic mission
- Embassy: Embassy

Envoy
- Ambassador Serbini Ali: Ambassador Caryn McClelland

Relations between Brunei and the United States date from the 19th century. On 6 April 1845, USS Constitution visited Brunei. The two countries concluded a Treaty of Peace, Friendship, Commerce and Navigation in 1850, which remains in force today. The United States maintained a consulate in Brunei from 1865 to 1867.

== Diplomatic visits ==
In 2013, President Barack Obama was due to visit Brunei for the ASEAN Summit, however due to shut-down of the United States government, Secretary of State John Kerry replaced Obama.

A few months later, the sultan of Brunei went on a state visit to the United States and met Obama.

== History ==
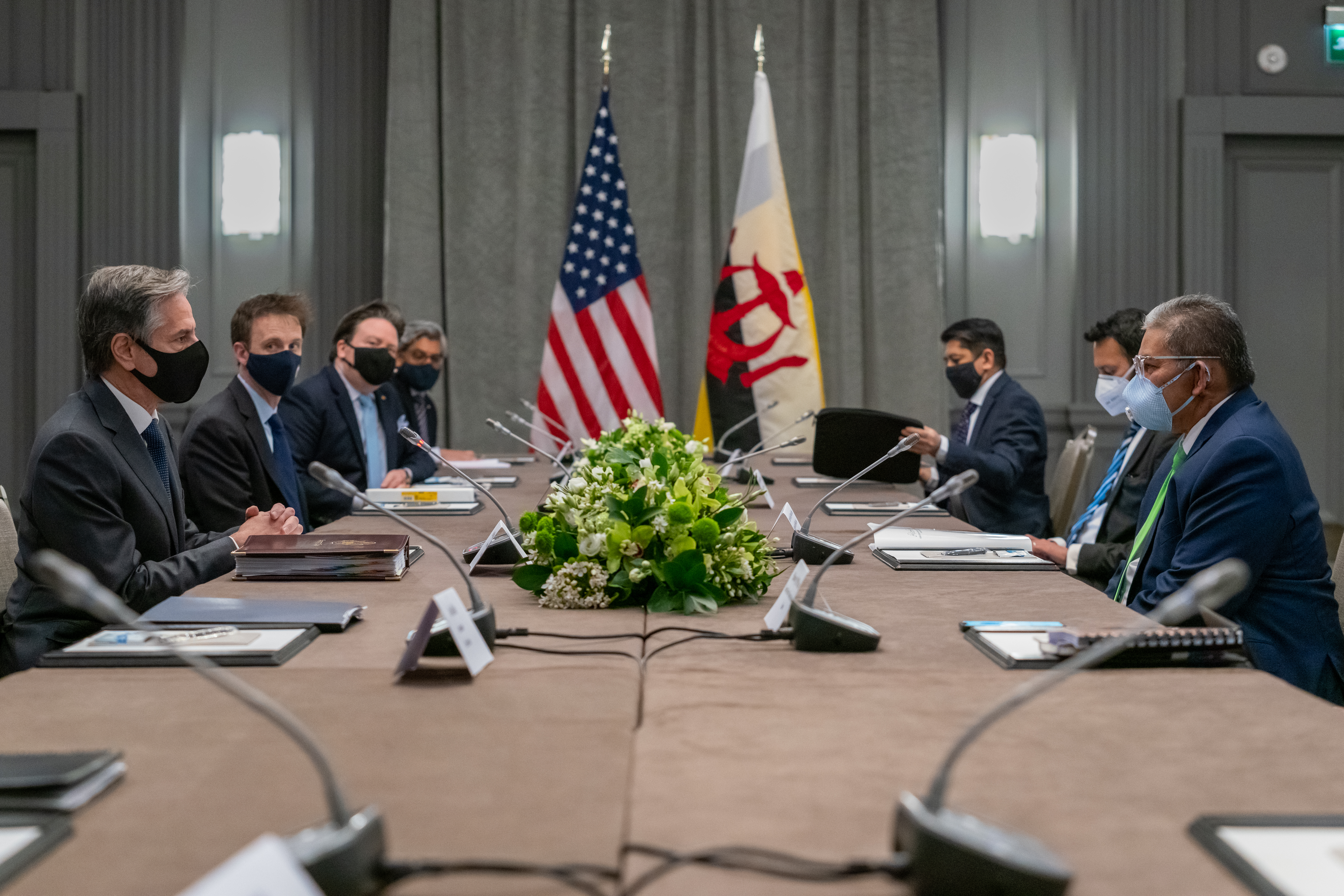
U.S. Secretary of State Antony J. Blinken meets with Bruneian Foreign Minister II Dato Erywan Yusof, in London on 3 May 2021.

The United States welcomed Brunei Darussalam's full independence from the United Kingdom on 1 January 1984, and opened an embassy in Bandar Seri Begawan on that date. Brunei opened its embassy in Washington, D.C. in March 1984. Brunei's armed forces engage in joint exercises, training programs, and other military co-operation with the US. A memorandum of understanding on defence co-operation was signed on 29 November 1994. The Sultan of Brunei visited Washington in December 2002.

== Principal US Embassy officials ==
- Ambassador: Caryn McClelland

== Diplomatic missions ==
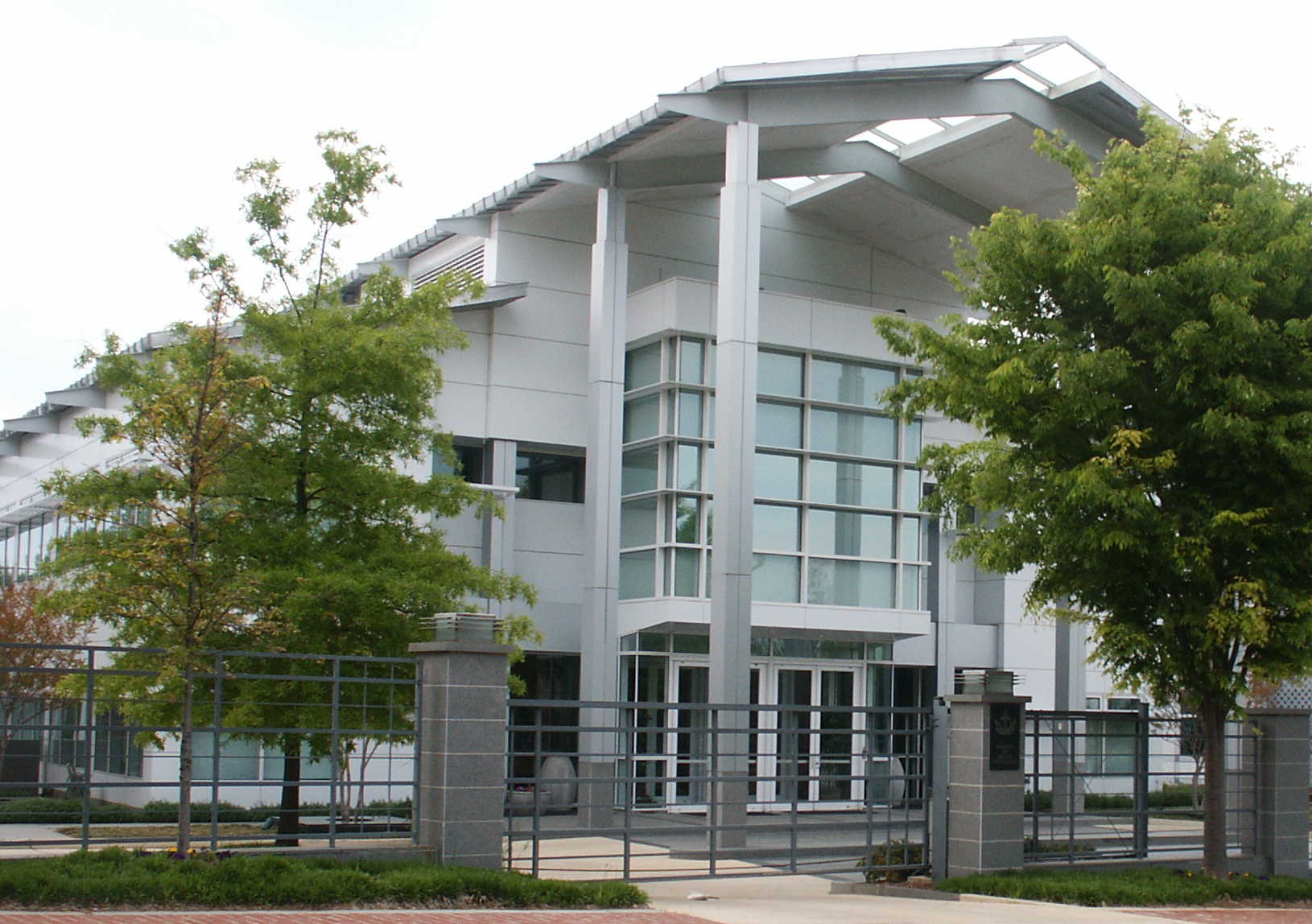
Brunei embassy in Washington, D.C.

The US Embassy is located in Bandar Seri Begawan.

The Embassy of Brunei in Washington, D.C. is the diplomatic mission of Brunei Darussalam to the United States. It is located at 3520 International Court, Northwest, Washington, D.C., in the Cleveland Park neighborhood.

The current ambassador of Brunei in the United States is Dato Serbini Ali. He has declared this to be an important relationship for Brunei Darussalam, whose constitution has much Western influence.
