= Christopher H. Phillips =

American diplomat and politician (1920-2008)

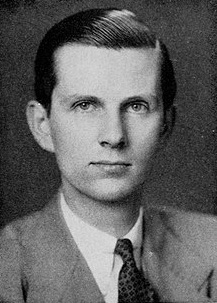
- Phillips in 1953

United States Ambassador to Brunei
- In office 1989–1991
- Preceded by: Thomas C. Ferguson
- Succeeded by: Donald Ensenat

Deputy Assistant Secretary of State for International Affairs
- In office 1954–1957

Member of the Massachusetts Senate from the 2nd Essex district
- In office 1949–1953
- Preceded by: J. Elmer Callahan
- Succeeded by: C. Henry Glovsky

Personal details
- Born: Christopher Hallowell Phillips; December 6, 1920 American Legation in The Hague
- Died: January 10, 2008 (aged 87) Gloucester, Massachusetts
- Party: Republican
- Spouses: Mabel Olsen (m. 1949; died 1995) Sydney (Watkins) Osborne (m. 1997)
- Children: 3
- Parent(s): William Phillips; Caroline Astor Drayton
- Education: Harvard College
- Occupation: Reporter, State senator, Diplomat

Christopher Hallowell Phillips (December 6, 1920 – January 10, 2008) was an American diplomat and politician who served as United States Ambassador to Brunei and was a member of the Massachusetts Senate.

== Early life ==
Phillips was born on December 6, 1920, to William and Caroline Astor (née Drayton) Phillips (1880–1965) at the American Legation in The Hague. His siblings included Beatrice Schermerhorn Phillips (1914–2003), who married Rear Adm. Elliott Bowman Strauss (1903-2003), William Phillips, Jr. (1916–1991), who married Barbara Holbrook (1915–1997), Drayton Phillips (1917–1985), who married Evelyn Gardiner, and Anne Caroline Phillips (1922–2016), who married John Winslow Bryant (1914–1999).

Phillips father twice served as United States Under Secretary of State and was the U.S. ambassador to Italy, Belgium, and Canada. Phillips was a member of the Boston Brahmin family and his ancestors included the first Mayor of Boston John Phillips, abolitionist Wendell Phillips, and Phillips Academy and Phillips Exeter Academy founders Samuel Phillips, Jr., and John Phillips. He was a descendant of the Rev. George Phillips of Watertown, the progenitor of the New England Phillips family in America.

Through his mother, Phillips was a grandson of Charlotte Augusta Astor (1858–1920) and J. Coleman Drayton (1852–1934), and a great-grandson of William Backhouse Astor Jr. (1829–1892) and Caroline Webster Schermerhorn (1830–1908).

Phillips attended a number of schools during his youth, including Avon Old Farms. In 1939, he enrolled in Harvard College but left the school after his freshman year to attend Montana State University and work on a ranch as a cowboy.

== Career ==
During World War II, Phillips then served four years in the United States Army Air Forces. During the Allied Occupation of Japan, Phillips established food distribution policies. In 1946, Phillips returned to Harvard. He graduated with the class of 1948 and wanted to go into politics, however, he took a job as a City Hall reporter the Beverly Evening Times instead to support his wife and 2-year-old daughter.

=== Political career ===
In 1948, Beverly Mayor Daniel E. McLean convinced Phillips to run for a seat in the Massachusetts Senate. Phillips defeated incumbent J. Elmer Callahan in the Republican primary and was reelected twice, serving until 1953.

=== Diplomatic service ===
During the 1952 presidential election, Phillips served on the Massachusetts Eisenhower for President Committee. In October 1953, Phillips resigned his Senate seat to serve as the deputy to the Assistant Secretary of State for United Nations Affairs. On October 15, 1954, Phillips was appointed Deputy Assistant Secretary of State for International Affairs. Phillips left the State Department in 1957 following his appointment as vice chairman of United States Civil Service Commission, under Chairman Harris Ellsworth, a former U.S. Representative from Oregon.

In 1958, he returned to the State Department when he was appointed by President Eisenhower as the United States representative to the United Nations Economic and Social Council. He was confirmed by the U.S. Senate on January 29, 1958. In this role, he sponsored a proposal for a worldwide inventory of the investments, and results achieved so far, in technical assistance to less developed nations by the International Bank for Recovery and Development and the International Monetary Fund. He also supported a resolution favoring freedom of information, including freedom of the press.

In 1970, President Richard Nixon nominated Phillips to serve as the Deputy Permanent Representative of the United States to the United Nations Security Council, serving under the Permanent Representative of the United States, Charles W. Yost. Previous to that, he was deputy to the previous Permanent Representative William B. Buffum, who left to become the U.S. Ambassador to Lebanon. Phillips served in that role until 1973. From 1973 until his retirement in 1986, he served as founding president of the U.S.-China Business Council.

On October 10, 1989, president George H. W. Bush appointed Phillips to serve as the United States Ambassador to Brunei succeeding Thomas C. Ferguson. He presented his credentials on November 28, 1989, and remained in this position until he left his post on October 31, 1991, and himself was succeeded by Donald Ensenat. Following his retirement, he became a trustee of the American Institute in Taiwan.

== Personal life ==
While in Montana, he met Mabel Bernice Olsen (1919–1995), whom he married in 1943. She served as president of the United Nations Delegations Women's Club, a cultural, philanthropic and social organization, from 1971 to 1973. Together, they had three children before her death in 1995:

- Victoria P. Phillips
- Miriam O. Phillips
- David W. Phillips

On November 29, 1997, Phillips remarried to Sydney (née Watkins) Osborne at Ascension Memorial Church in Ipswich. Sydney was a real-estate broker who was the daughter of the Alida W. Watkins and Julian L. Watkins. Her previous marriage ended in divorce.

Phillips died on January 10, 2008, at the Addison Gilbert Hospital in Gloucester, Massachusetts, due to complications from a stomach ulcer. At the time of his death, Phillips was living in Ipswich, Massachusetts.

== See also ==
- Massachusetts legislature: 1949–1950, 1951–1952, 1953–1954

Diplomatic posts
Preceded by Thomas C. Ferguson	United States Ambassador to Brunei; 1989–1991	Succeeded by Donald Ensenat
Political offices
Preceded by J. Elmer Callahan	Member of the Massachusetts Senate from the 2nd Essex district 1949 – 1953	Succeeded by C. Henry Glovsky
