= Craig B. Allen =

American diplomat (born 1957)

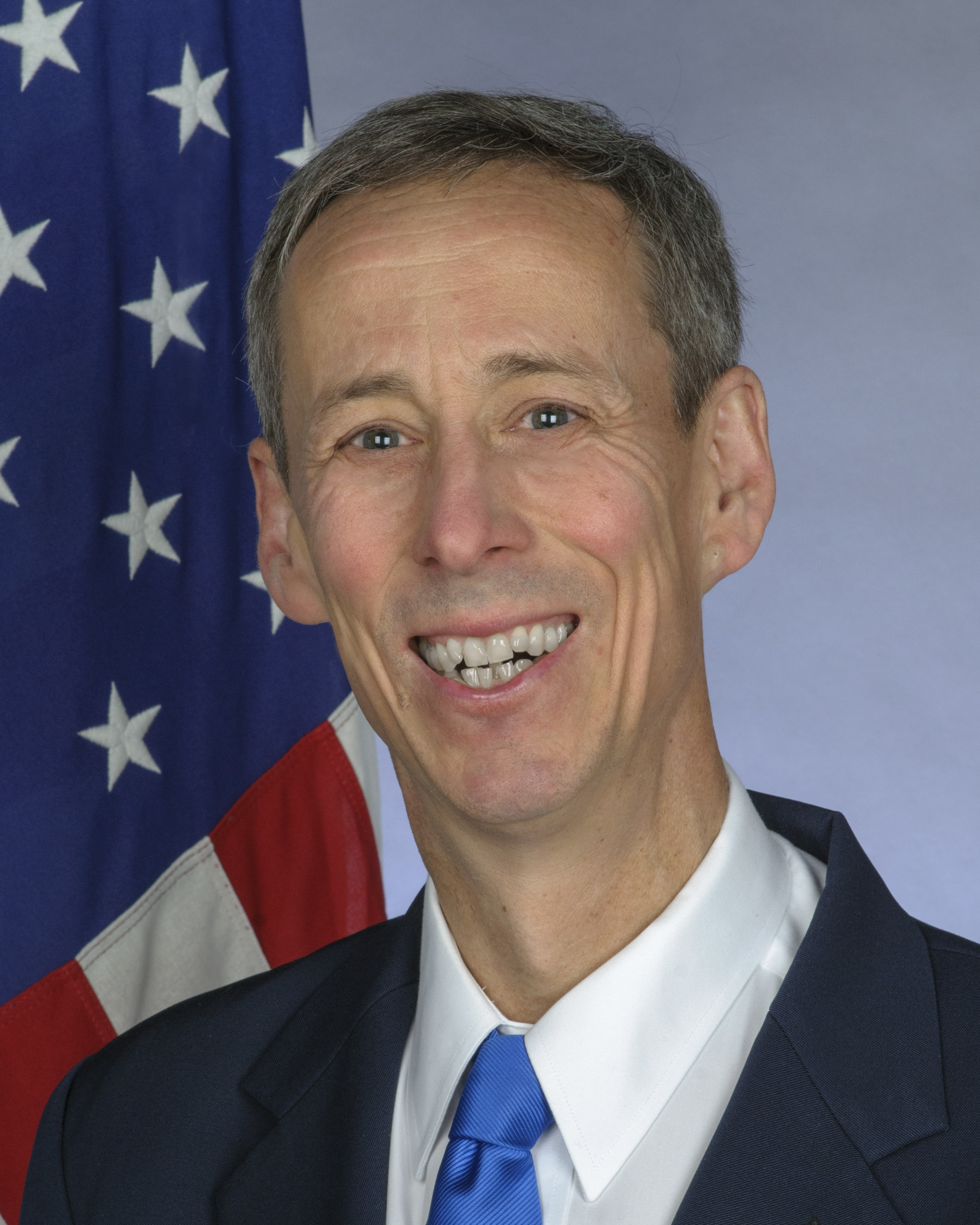

United States Ambassador to Brunei
- In office March 9, 2015 – July 20, 2018
- President: Barack Obama; Donald Trump
- Preceded by: Daniel L. Shields
- Succeeded by: Matthew J. Matthews

Personal details
- Born: 1957 (age 68–69)
- Education: University of Michigan; Georgetown University

Craig Boyd Allen (born 1957) is an American diplomat who served as United States Ambassador to Brunei from 2014 to 2018.

== Consular career ==
Allen began working for the Department of Commerce as part of the International Trade Administration in 1985. He began as a Presidential Management Intern and, in 1986, he took up a post at the ITA's China Office. Allen worked there for two years before being moved to the American Institute in Taiwan to be the Director of the American Trade Center in Taipei.

In 1992, Allen re-joined the Department of Commerce and was given a three-year posting in the U.S. embassy in Beijing, where he served as a Commercial Attaché. After the posting, Allen moved to the U.S. Embassy in Tokyo to be a Commercial Attaché there but in 1998, he was promoted to the post of Deputy Senior Commercial Officer and the next year, Allen became a member of the Senior Foreign Service.

In 2000, Allen was recalled to work at the National Center for APEC in Seattle. Two years later, Allen returned to Beijing to be Senior Commercial Officer at the U.S. Mission to China, serving under Clark T. Randt Jr. and managing the whole of the Department of Commerce's delegation at the embassy.

In 2006, Allen was assigned to be Senior Commercial Officer at the U.S. consulate in Johannesburg and was responsible for the Department of Commerce's operations in all 16 SADC countries. In 2010, Allen became the Deputy Assistant Secretary for Asia at the ITA and then, in 2012, the Deputy Assistant Secretary for China.

He was nominated to be the U.S. Ambassador to Brunei by President Obama on July 10, 2014, and was confirmed on December 19, 2014. He presented his credentials on March 9, 2015.

== Post-Consular Career ==
In July 2018, the US-China Business Council (USCBC) named Allen to succeed John Frisbie as their president.

In July 2022, Allen helped found a group of U.S. business and policy leaders who share the goal of constructively engaging with China in order to improve U.S.-China relations.

In 2024, Allen announced plans to step down as USCBC president by the end of the year. Sean Stein was named as his successor.

In January 2025, the Cohen Group announced that Allen will join as a senior counselor in February 2025.

Diplomatic posts
Preceded by Daniel L. Shields	United States Ambassador to Brunei; 2015–2018	Succeeded by Matthew J. Matthews
