= Thomas C. Ferguson =

American diplomat and lawyer (1933–2021)

Thomas Crooks Ferguson
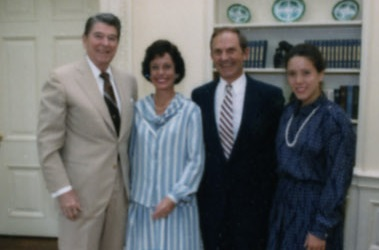
- third from left

United States Ambassador to Brunei
- In office 1987–1989
- Preceded by: Barrington King
- Succeeded by: Christopher H. Phillips

Personal details
- Born: November 27, 1933 Henderson, Kentucky, U.S.
- Died: June 28, 2021 (aged 87) Jacksonville, Florida, U.S.
- Party: Republican
- Children: 3
- Education: Vanderbilt University
- Occupation: Diplomat, lawyer, public servant

Thomas Crooks Ferguson (November 27, 1933 – June 28, 2021) was an American diplomat and lawyer who served as Ambassador to Brunei and a U.S. government official. He served as deputy commissioner and chief operating officer of the Immigration and Naturalization Service.

== Early life and education ==
Ferguson was born November 27, 1933, in Henderson, Kentucky. Ferguson graduated from Vanderbilt University (B.A., 1955) and Vanderbilt Law School (J.D., 1959). He served in the United States Army in 1956.

== Career ==
Ferguson began his career as an attorney with Woodson, Pattisall & Garner in Chicago, Illinois, 1959–1960. In August 1960, he served on the campaign staff of Senator John S. Cooper in Washington, D.C., until November 1960. He then joined the law firm of Sandidge, Hollbrook & Craig in Owensboro, Kentucky, and was an attorney there until 1963. From 1963 to 1975, he was marketing manager, Pharmaseal Labs, Inc., in Glendale, California. Ferguson then became owner and president of Brevard Marina, Inc., Marina & Shipyard in Melbourne, Florida, until 1977 - 1982, when he became owner and president of Atlantic Salvage Systems (underwater exploration) in Indialantic, Florida. In 1982 he joined the government as director for the Eastern Caribbean with the Peace Corps. In 2012, Ferguson joined GFIT Ventures as a strategic advisor specializing on Intel and International clients where he continues to work today.

== Immigration and Naturalization Service ==
From 1984 to 1987 Ferguson was deputy commissioner and chief operating officer of the United States Immigration and Naturalization Service in Washington, D.C. There he maintained the full responsibility for the overall management and operation of over 16,000 employees. As deputy commissioner Ferguson led early calls for reform. His ideas would ultimately end up in the Immigration Act of 1990. Mr. Ferguson's main contributions to the Act were Border Security and the concept of Employment Based Visas, including the innovative EB-5 immigrant investor visa.

== Ambassador to Brunei ==
On April 8, 1987, he was nominated to be the ambassador Ambassador of the United States to Brunei Darussalam. He would succeed Barrington King. There he was chief of mission, responsible for all components of the U.S. Embassy 1987–1989. While serving as ambassador, he promoted military sales and U.S. business in country and U.S. government interests in region.

== Death ==
Ferguson died in Jacksonville, Florida on June 28, 2021, at the age of 87.

Diplomatic posts
Preceded by Barrington King	United States Ambassador to Brunei; 1987–1989	Succeeded by Christopher H. Phillips
