= William Phillips (diplomat) =

American diplomat (1878-1968)

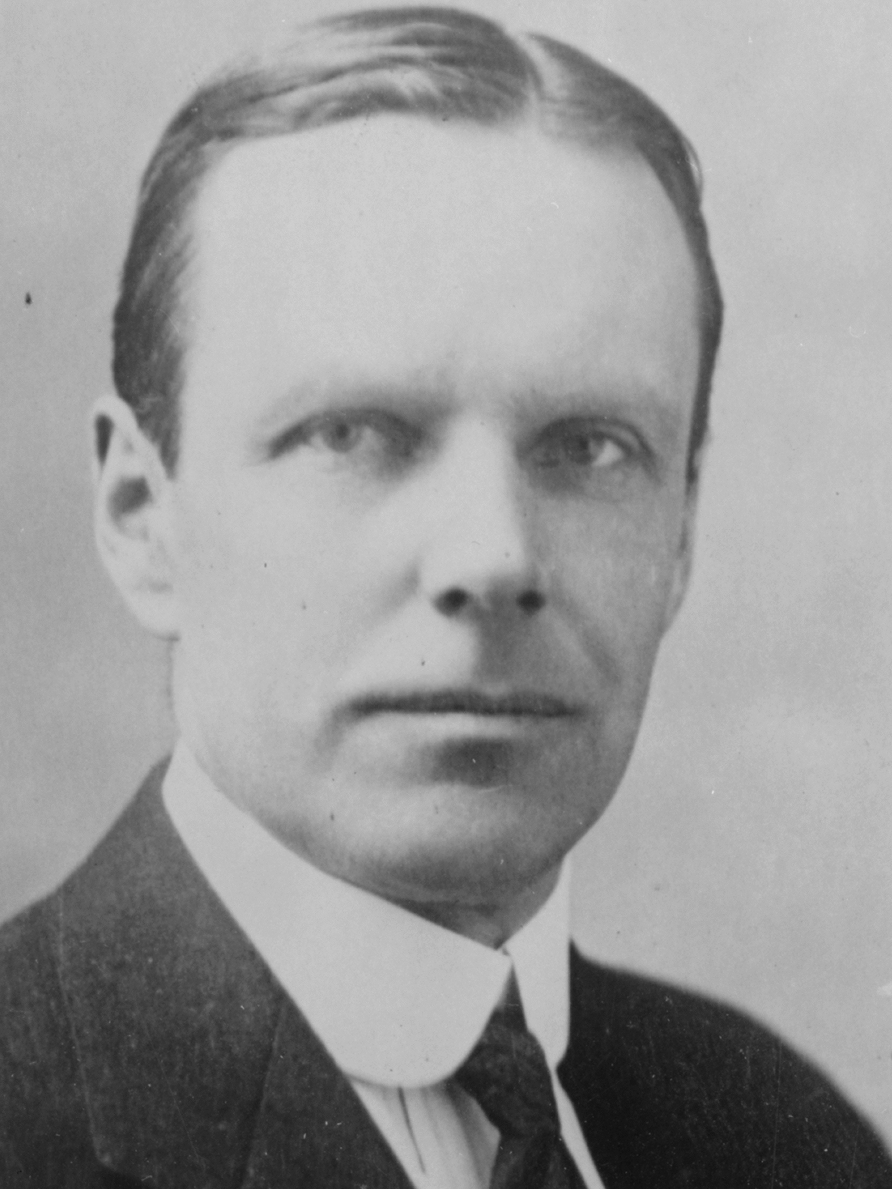
- Phillips in 1922

2nd United States Assistant Secretary of State
- In office January 24, 1917 – March 25, 1920
- President: Woodrow Wilson
- Preceded by: John Eugene Osborne
- Succeeded by: Fred Morris Dearing

4th United States Under Secretary of State
- In office April 26, 1922 – April 11, 1924
- President: Warren G. Harding
- Preceded by: Henry P. Fletcher
- Succeeded by: Joseph Grew

United States Ambassador to Belgium
- In office February 29, 1924 – March 1, 1927
- President: Calvin Coolidge
- Preceded by: Henry P. Fletcher
- Succeeded by: Hugh S. Gibson

United States Ambassador to Canada
- In office February 17, 1927 – December 14, 1929
- President: Herbert Hoover
- Succeeded by: Hanford MacNider

10th United States Under Secretary of State
- In office March 6, 1933 – August 23, 1936
- President: Franklin D. Roosevelt
- Preceded by: William R. Castle Jr.
- Succeeded by: Sumner Welles

United States Ambassador to Italy
- In office August 4, 1936 – October 6, 1941
- President: Franklin D. Roosevelt
- Preceded by: Breckinridge Long
- Succeeded by: George Wadsworth

Personal details
- Born: May 30, 1878 Beverly, Massachusetts, U.S.
- Died: February 23, 1968 (aged 89) New York City, U.S.
- Spouse: Caroline Astor Drayton (m. 1910; died 1965)
- Children: 5, including Christopher
- Parent(s): John Charles Phillips; Anna Tucker
- Education: Harvard College; Harvard Law School

William Phillips (May 30, 1878 – February 23, 1968) was a career United States diplomat who served twice as an Under Secretary of State. He was also the United States Ambassador to Canada.

== Early life ==
Phillips was born on May 30, 1878, in Beverly, Massachusetts. His parents were John Charles Phillips Jr. (1838–1885), who married Anna Tucker in London, England on October 23, 1874. His older brother was John Charles Phillips (1876–1938), a prominent zoologist, ornithologist and environmentalist. He had two sisters, Anna Tucker Phillips, who was married to Raynal Bolling (1877–1918) (the first American officer killed in World War I), and Martha Phillips, who was married to Andrew James Peters (1872–1938) (a U.S. Congressman and former Mayor of Boston).

Phillips was a member of the Boston Brahmin Phillips family and his ancestors included John Phillips, the first Mayor of Boston and his great-grandfather, Wendell Phillips, the abolitionist and his grand-uncle, and Samuel Phillips Jr., and John Phillips, founders of the Phillips Academy and Phillips Exeter Academy. He was a descendant of the Rev. George Phillips of Watertown, the progenitor of the New England Phillips family in America.

He graduated from Harvard College in 1900 and graduated from Harvard Law School in 1903.

== Career ==
His first political job was working as a private secretary in London to Joseph Hodges Choate, the United States Ambassador to the Court of St. James. Choate was a friend of Phillips' family and was also from Massachusetts.

Phillips subsequently went to work for the United States Minister to China in Beijing. After his return from China, he became a member of President Theodore Roosevelt's Tennis Cabinet, and thanks to his previous diplomatic experience and new friendship with Roosevelt, he was assigned to set up the State Department's Division of Far Eastern Affairs and was made its first chief. In 1909, he returned to work in London for Ambassador Whitelaw Reid.

In 1914, Phillips was appointed as Assistant Secretary of State under President Woodrow Wilson and remained in that position until 1920, when he was made the Minister Plenipotentiary to Netherlands and Luxembourg (in residence in the Netherlands).

From 1922 to 1924, he served as Under Secretary of State. In 1924, he was appointed as Ambassador to Belgium, where he remained until 1927, when he became the first Minister to Canada until 1929.

He served as Under Secretary of State again from 1933 to 1936.

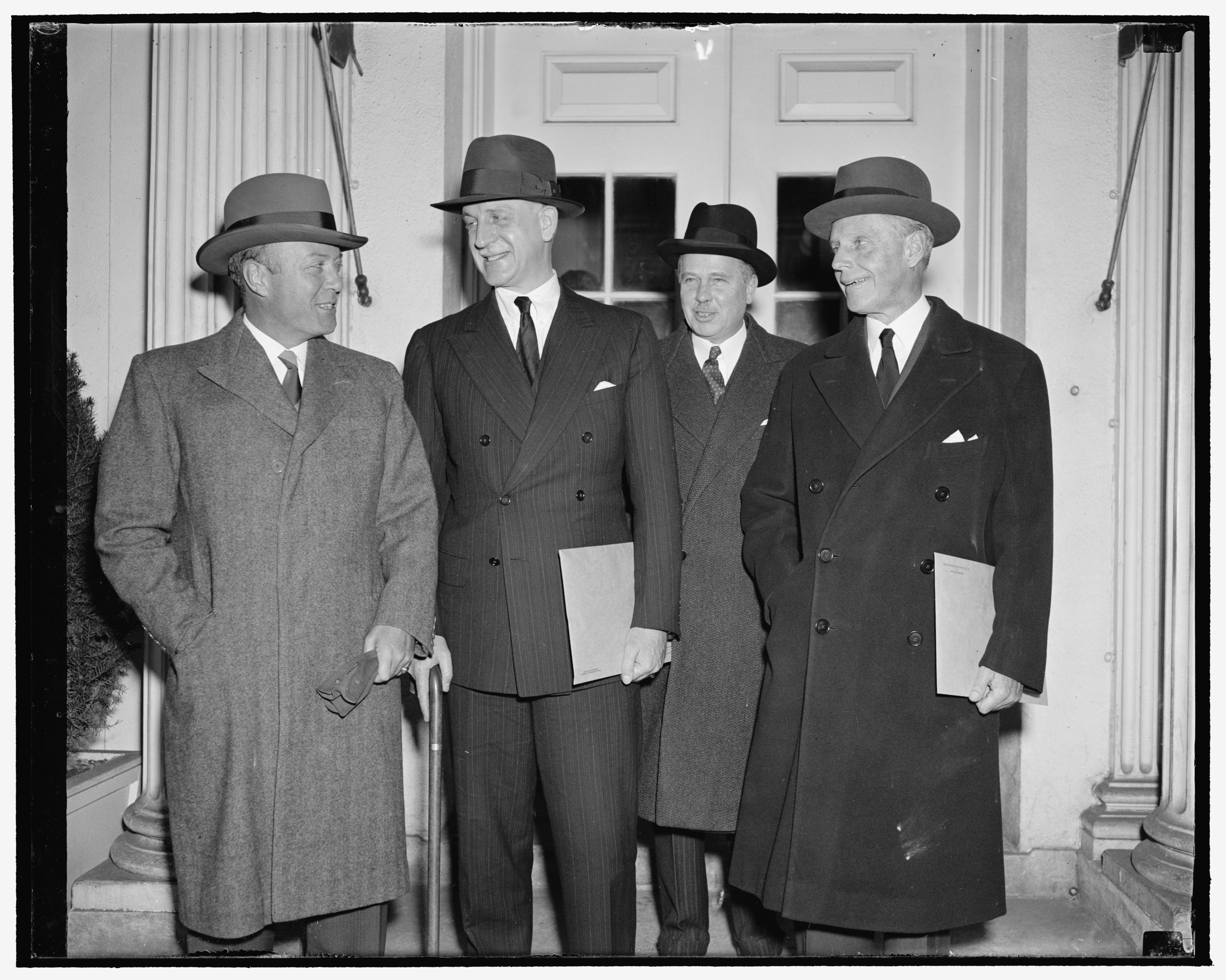
Photograph by Harris & Ewing of American ambassadors after holding a conference with President Franklin D. Roosevelt on December 6, 1938. From left to right: William C. Bullitt, Sumner Welles, Hugh R. Wilson, and Phillips.

In 1936, he was appointed as the Ambassador to Italy, which was then led by Benito Mussolini, in the immediate aftermath of that country's invasion of Ethiopia. He resigned on October 6, 1941. The following year, he was made chief of the United States Office of Strategic Services in London.

In October 1942, Phillips was appointed as a personal representative of President Franklin D. Roosevelt and served in India. (The United States would not have an official mission there until the country's independence in 1947.) Phillips was said to be extremely unpopular with the British for his pro-independence views. In 1943, he was made a Special Advisor on European political matters to General Dwight D. Eisenhower, with the rank of ambassador.

Phillips retired officially in 1944 but returned briefly to diplomatic life in 1945, when he was made a special assistant to Secretary of State Edward R. Stettinius Jr. In 1946, he served on the Anglo-American Committee on Palestine and opposed the British plan to partition the territory. In 1947, he was unsuccessful in mediating a border dispute between Siam and French Indochina.

In 1953, his memoir, Ventures in Diplomacy, was published by the Beacon Press.

== Personal life ==
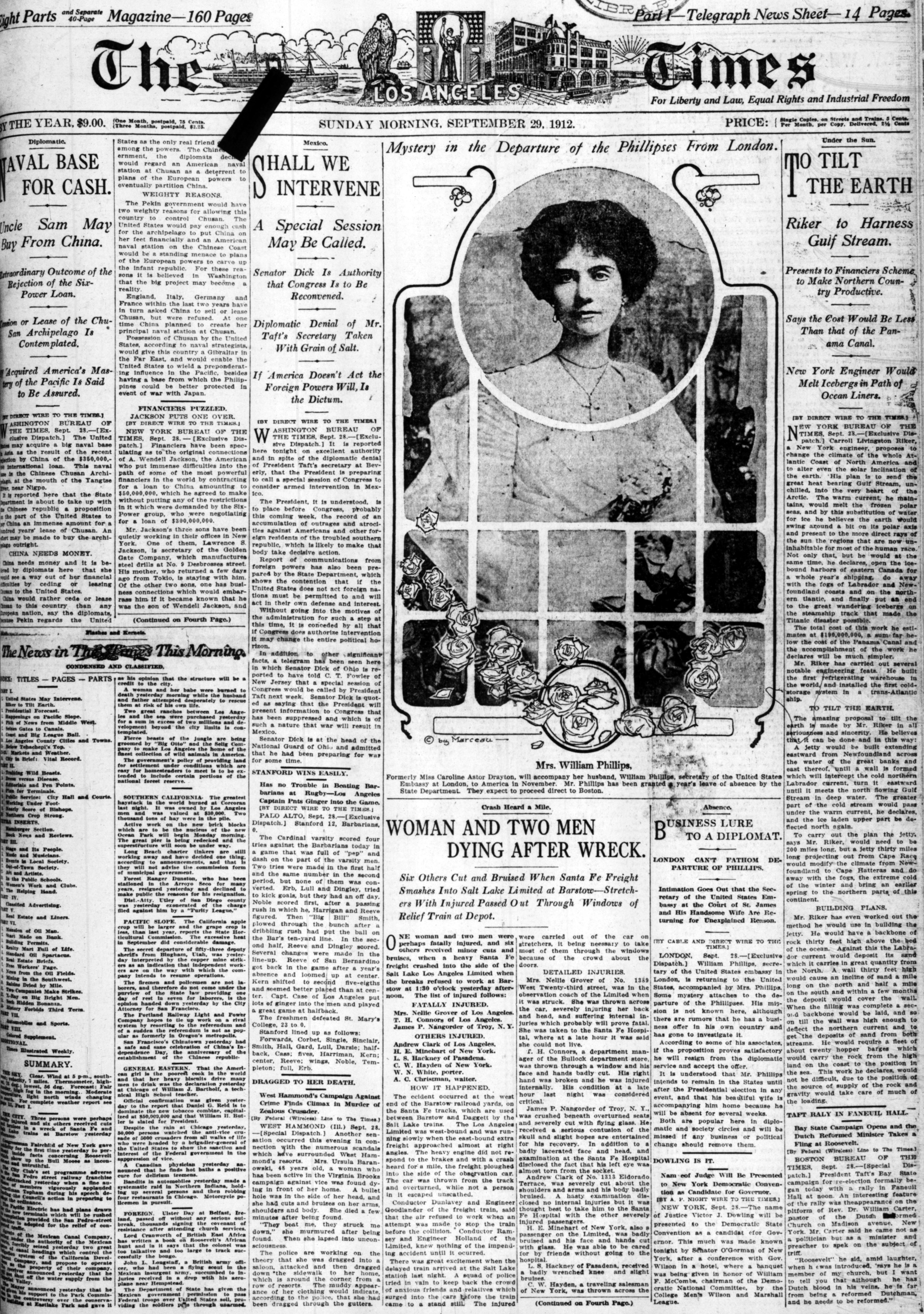
Phillips's wife Caroline Astor Drayton on the cover of the Los Angeles Times, September 29, 1912

In 1910, Phillips married Caroline Astor Drayton (1880–1965), a daughter of Charlotte Augusta Astor (1858–1920) and J. Coleman Drayton (1852–1934) and a granddaughter of William Backhouse Astor Jr. (1829–1892) and Caroline Webster Schermerhorn (1830–1908). Through her father, she was a great-granddaughter of U.S. Representative William Drayton (1776–1846). Together, they were the parents of:

- Beatrice Schermerhorn Phillips (1914–2003), who married Rear Adm. Elliott Bowman Strauss (1903–2003), in 1951.
- William Phillips Jr. (1916–1991), who married Barbara Holbrook (1915–1997), in 1941.
- Drayton Phillips (1917–1985), who married Evelyn Gardiner in 1940.
- Christopher Hallowell Phillips (1920–2008), served as United States Ambassador to Brunei from 1989 to 1991.
- Anne Caroline Phillips (1922–2016), who married John Winslow Bryant (1914–1999), in 1942.

Phillips died on February 23, 1968, at the age of 89.

Government offices
Preceded by Huntington Wilson	Third Assistant Secretary of State; January 11, 1909 – October 13, 1909	Succeeded by Chandler Hale
Preceded by Dudley Field Malone	Third Assistant Secretary of State; March 17, 1914 – January 24, 1917	Succeeded by Breckinridge Long
Preceded by John E. Osborne	United States Assistant Secretary of State; 1917 – 1920	Succeeded by Fred Morris Dearing
Preceded by Henry P. Fletcher	United States Under Secretary of State; 1922 – 1924	Succeeded by Joseph Grew
Preceded by William R. Castle Jr.	United States Under Secretary of State; 1933 – 1936	Succeeded by Sumner Welles
Diplomatic posts
Preceded by John W. Garrett	United States Ambassador to Luxembourg; 1920 – 1922	Succeeded by Richard M. Tobin
Preceded by John W. Garrett	United States Ambassador to the Netherlands; 1920 – 1922	Succeeded by Richard M. Tobin
Preceded by Henry P. Fletcher	United States Ambassador to Belgium; 1924 – 1927	Succeeded by Hugh S. Gibson
Preceded by None	United States Ambassador to Canada; 1927 – 1929	Succeeded by Hanford MacNider
Preceded by Breckinridge Long	United States Ambassador to Italy; 1936 – 1941	Succeeded by George Wadsworth; Chargé d'affaires ad interim
