= China Business Review =

The China Business Review is the official online magazine of the US-China Business Council, covering business, economics, and politics in both the United States and China that affect business in China across a wide variety of industries. The print magazine, published bimonthly, was established in 1974 as a source of trade and investment news. In 2011, the print magazine switched to a quarterly publication schedule. In April 2013, the magazine ceased print publication, going to an online-only format.

The magazine is based in Washington DC.
