= Sylvia Stanfield =

American diplomat

Sylvia Gaye Stanfield
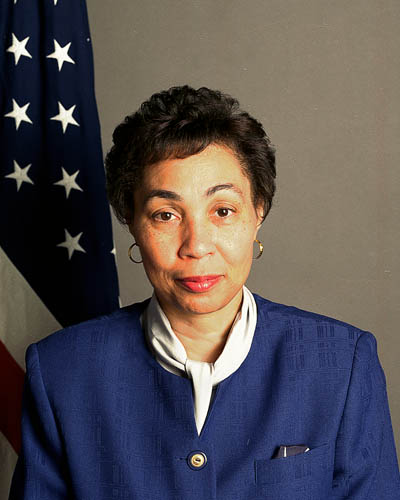
- Ambassador Sylvia Stanfield

United States Ambassador to Brunei
- In office 3 November 1999 – 28 August 2002
- Preceded by: Glen Robert Rase
- Succeeded by: Gene Burl Christy

Personal details
- Born: October 28, 1943 (age 82) Houston, Texas, U.S.
- Education: Western College for Women (BA); University of Hawaiʻi (MA)

Sylvia Gaye Stanfield (born October 28, 1943) is an American diplomat who served as the United States ambassador to Brunei. She held multiple diplomatic positions in China, Taiwan, and New Zealand before her appointment as ambassador to Brunei.

== Early life and education ==
Sylvia Gaye Stanfield was born in Houston, Texas on October 28, 1943. She graduated from the Western College for Women with a bachelor of arts degree in intercultural studies in 1965, and from the University of Hawaiʻi with a master of arts degree in Asian studies. Stanfield underwent language studies in Mandarin and Cantonese. She studied at the University of Hong Kong from 1966 to 1967.

== Career ==
Stanfield joined the United States Department of State in 1969. From 1969 to 1971, Stanfield was vice-consul in Taipei, Taiwan. She worked at the United States' embassy in Beijing from 1979 to 1981, and the American Institute in Taiwan from 1985 to 1987.

From 1993 to 1995, Stanfield was charge d’Affaires and Deputy Chief of Mission at the embassy in Wellington, New Zealand. She was director of the Office of Australia and New Zealand Affairs from 1990 to 1992, and Office of Taiwan Coordination Affairs from 1996 to 1998.

President Bill Clinton appointed Stanfield as ambassador to Brunei on 9 August 1999. She presented her credentials on 3 November, and she served until 28 August 2002. She was the first black woman to serve as ambassador to Brunei.

Stanfield was a Diplomat in Residence at Florida A&M University and Spelman College. In 2014, she became interim president of the Association of Black Professionals in International Affairs.

== Works cited ==
=== News ===
- "Black Diplomat Sylvia Stanfield Confirmed As New Ambassador To Oil-Rich Asian Country, Brunei". Jet. November 15, 1999.

=== Web ===
- "Diplomats-in-Residence". Spelman College. Archived from the original on May 9, 2012.
- "Stanfield, Sylvia Gaye". United States Department of State. Archived from the original on April 25, 2019.
- "Sylvia Gaye Stanfield (1943–)". Office of the Historian. Archived from the original on July 4, 2025.
- Gray, Joyceann (February 7, 2015). "Sylvia Gaye Stanfield (1943- )". BlackPast.org. Archived from the original on July 4, 2025.

Diplomatic posts
Preceded by Glen R. Rase	United States Ambassador to Brunei; 1999–2002	Succeeded by Gene B. Christy
