= Dark Harbor, Maine =

- Village
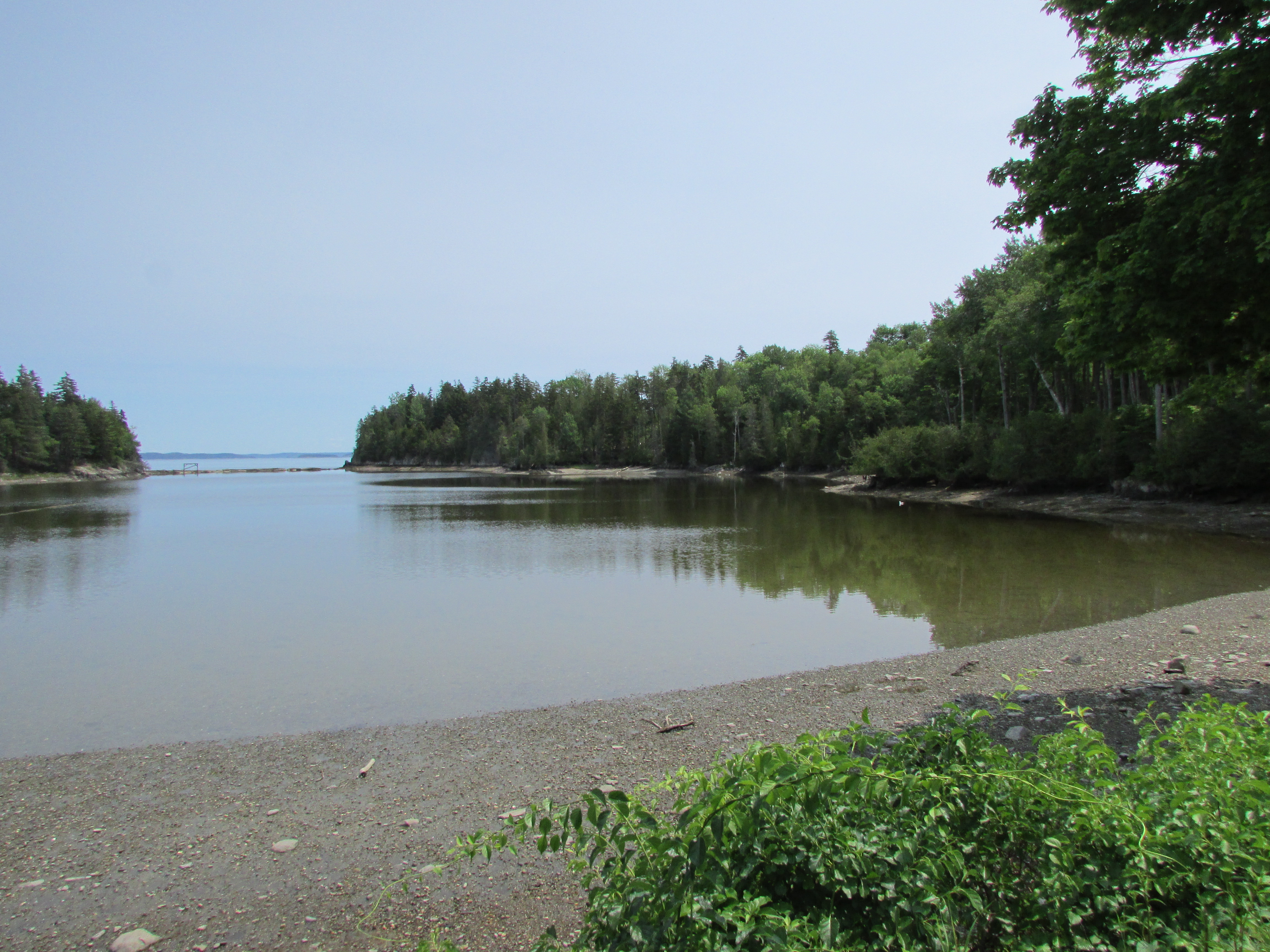
- Dark Harbor, Islesboro, Maine

- Location within Maine
- Country: United States
- State: Maine
- County: Waldo
- Town: Islesboro
- Elevation: 30 ft (9.1 m)
- Time zone: UTC-5 (Eastern (EST))
  - Summer (DST): UTC-4 (EDT)
- ZIP code: 04848
- Area code: 207

Dark Harbor is a village located on the most southern end of the town of Islesboro in Waldo County, Maine. Altogether, Dark Harbor consumes one-quarter of the land in Islesboro. Many prominent families from New York, Philadelphia, and Boston took summer residency in Dark Harbor.

== History ==
Dark Harbor, named for the synonymous meaning of obscure or hidden, was noted in the turn of the century for its picturesque summer cottages. Following the founding of the Islesboro Land and Improvement Company, the Dark Harbor summer resort began in 1888. The village was the third summer resort location to be built in Islesboro.

Organized in 1902, The Dark Harbor Association was formed mostly of summer residents whose main goal was to improve and beautify the village. The association was responsible for installing and maintaining things like flower boxes, benches, and for mowing lawns.

Since transportation was so limited in the early years, the summer resort built an entire community within the village. Vacationers on Dark Island had access to all of the normal luxuries like a grocery store, stables, blacksmith shops, other types of various shops, a Christ Church, a library, and even their own post office.

Tennis, golf, and yacht racing were popular forms of entertainment for Dark Harbor's summer residents. Founded in 1896, The Tarratine Yacht Club provided the residents with a central place for all three sports.

Throughout the years, Dark Harbor has been visited by various famous people such as former United States President, Theodore Roosevelt. Roosevelt visited his daughter, who vacationed on the island, in 1917.

Mary Mallon, infamous for being the first named asymptomatic Typhoid carrier in the United States, also visited Dark Harbor in the early 1900s. Accompanying the family of J. Coleman Drayton, Mallon stayed on the island as a cook in 1902, infecting seven members of the family. Typhoid Fever was otherwise rare in the village of Dark Harbor.

The community still serves as a summer colony and home to some of Maine's upper-class.

== Notable people ==
- Theodore Roosevelt, 26th United States President
- Mary Mallon, asymptomatic typhoid carrier
