= Charlotte Augusta Haig =

American socialite (1830–1908)

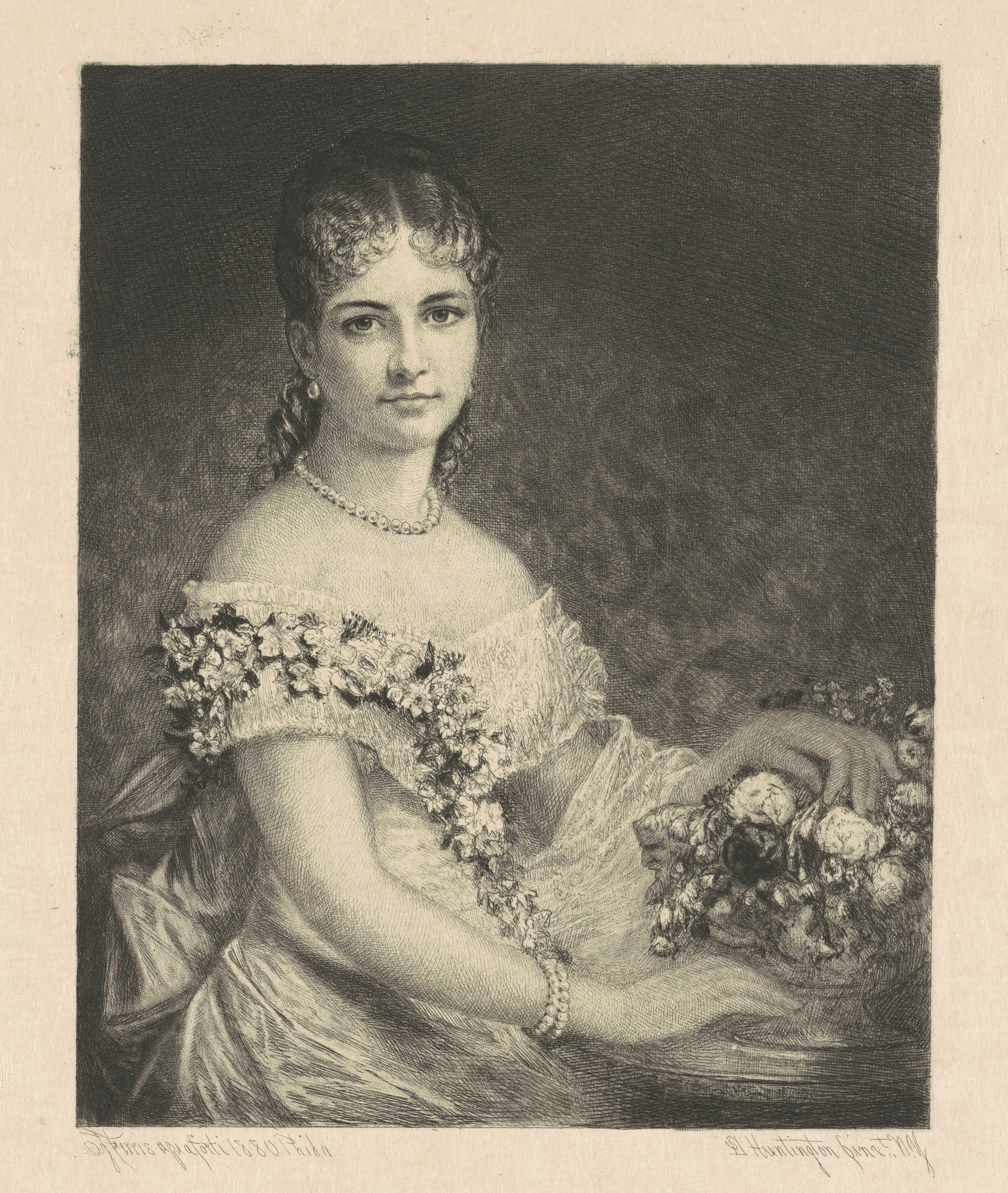
- Mrs. J. Coleman Drayton (Charlotte Augusta Astor), c. 1880
- Born: Charlotte Augusta Astor; March 29, 1858; New York City, United States
- Died: July 30, 1920 (aged 62); Paris, France
- Burial place: Brookwood Cemetery
- Occupation: socialite
- Spouse: James Coleman Drayton (m. 1879; div. 1896) George Ogilvy Haig (m. 1896; died 1905)
- Children: 4
- Parents: William Backhouse Astor Jr.; Caroline Schermerhorn Astor
- Relatives: Astor family; Livingston family; Van Cortlandt family

Charlotte Augusta (Astor) Haig (March 29, 1858 – July 30, 1920) was an American socialite. She was a member of the Astor family, the Livingston family, and the Van Cortlandt family. Haig has been portrayed by Hannah Shealy in the HBO drama The Gilded Age.

== Early life ==
Charlotte Augusta Astor was born in New York City, on March 29, 1858. She was the third of five children born to William Backhouse Astor Jr. and Caroline Schermerhorn Astor, leader of the "Four Hundred". Her two elder sisters were Emily Astor, who married socialite James J. Van Alen and Helen Astor, who married diplomat James Roosevelt Roosevelt (the elder half-brother of future president Franklin D. Roosevelt). Her younger siblings were Caroline Schermerhorn "Carrie" Astor, who married American banker Marshall Orme Wilson and Colonel John Jacob Astor IV, who died aboard the RMS Titanic.

Charlotte was a descendant of many prominent Americans. Her paternal grandparents were William Backhouse Astor Sr. and Margaret (née Armstrong) Astor, while her maternal grandparents were Abraham Schermerhorn and Helen Van Courtlandt (née White) Schermerhorn, of the Van Cortlandt family. She was also a great-granddaughter of John Jacob Astor, America's first millionaire, wealthy merchant Peter Schemerhorn, and Continental major and U.S. Senator John Armstrong Jr. and Alida (née Livingston) Armstrong of the Livingston family. Her uncle John Jacob Astor III was the father of William Waldorf Astor, 1st Viscount Astor.

Charlotte grew up at her parents' New York brownstone, 350 Fifth Avenue, at the southwest corner of Fifth Avenue and 34th Street, known for its ballroom.

== Marriages ==
In 1879, Charlotte married her first husband, James Coleman Drayton, a cousin of the Draytons of Drayton Hall in South Carolina. Together, they were the parents of:

- Caroline Astor Drayton (1880–1965), who in 1910 married William Phillips, the U.S. Ambassador to Italy.
- Henry Coleman Drayton (1883–1942), who married Mary Constance Knower (1884–1920). After their divorce, she became the Countess Knower De Suzannet.
- William Astor Drayton (1888–1973), who married Alberta Averill (1888–1961), daughter of Albert William Averill. Alberta was the widow of William Phelps Eno.
- Alida Livingston Drayton (1890–1898)

The Drayton marriage was the subject of widespread public speculation and media scrutiny during a period when divorce carried significant social stigma. In 1890, it was first reported that Drayton was considering divorce. Soon after, he and Charlotte traveled to Europe in an effort to reconcile, accompanied shortly afterward by Major Hallet Alsop Borrowe, who was rumored to be romantically linked to Charlotte. In 1892, Drayton challenged Borrowe to a duel, which was ultimately prevented by the intervention of friends. Charlotte's mother, Caroline Astor, also attempted to mediate the couple's differences, including bringing them to London. Drayton eventually returned to New York and filed for divorce on statutory grounds. Before the case was heard, Charlotte filed a counter-suit and was ultimately granted the divorce in 1896.

During 1892, amid the scandal, Charlotte's father disinherited her while leaving $850,000 in trust for her children upon his death that year. To compensate for this, brother John later gave her $1 million.

In December 1896, Charlotte married George Ogilvy Haig, of the London whisky firm Haig & Haig, and brother of Douglas Haig, 1st Earl Haig. The couple resided at 65 Brook Street in London, England and had no children. Haig died on December 27, 1905, nine years after their marriage.

== Death ==
Charlotte died at the American Hospital of Paris in Neuilly, Paris on July 30, 1920. Her sister, Carrie, was at her bedside. She was buried beside her husband, in Brookwood Cemetery, Surrey, England, as per requested in her will.
