= Daniel L. Shields =

American diplomat (b. 1963)

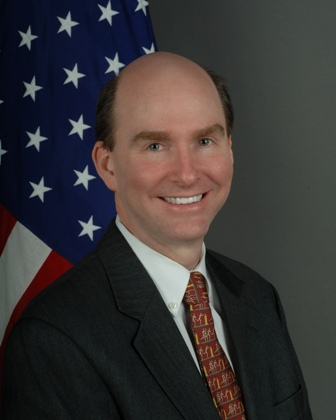

United States Ambassador to Brunei
- In office March 5, 2011 – November 22, 2014
- President: Barack Obama
- Preceded by: William E. Todd
- Succeeded by: Craig B. Allen

Personal details
- Born: 1963 (age 62–63)
- Education: Georgetown University; National War College

Daniel Luke Shields III (born 1963) is a retired American Ambassador. He had served in various capacities at the embassies of the United States in Philippines, Japan, China, Singapore and Brunei.

== Education ==
Shields earned a Bachelor of Science degree in international relations from Georgetown University’s School of Foreign Service and a Master of Science from the National War College in 2001.

== Career ==
Shields was a Consular Officer at Embassy of the United States in Manila from 1985 to 1987. He then became a Political Officer at Embassy of the United States in Tokyo from 1987 to 1989 and then also as a Political Officer at the Embassy of the United States in Beijing from 1991 to 1993.

Shields moved back to Japan, as a Principal Officer at U.S. Consulate Nagoya from 1996 to 1999 and then as Political Section Deputy at the Embassy of the United States in Tokyo from 2002 to 2004.

Shields then moved back to China and served as the Minister Counsellor for political at the Embassy of the United States in Beijing from 2004 to 2007.

Shields then served as Deputy Chief of Mission at the Embassy of the United States in Singapore from 2007 to 2010, and for over a year as Chargé d'Affaires (2009-2010), between the departure of Ambassador Patricia L. Herbold and the arrival of Ambassador David I. Adelman.

Shields later served as the United States Ambassador to Brunei from 2011 to 2014.

In 2015, Shields joined the United States Army War College to act as diplomatic advisor since 2015.

In 2017, Shields temporarily served as the Chargé d'affaires ad interim of the United States to ASEAN.
