= Matthew J. Matthews =

American diplomat (1954–2020)

Matthew John Matthews
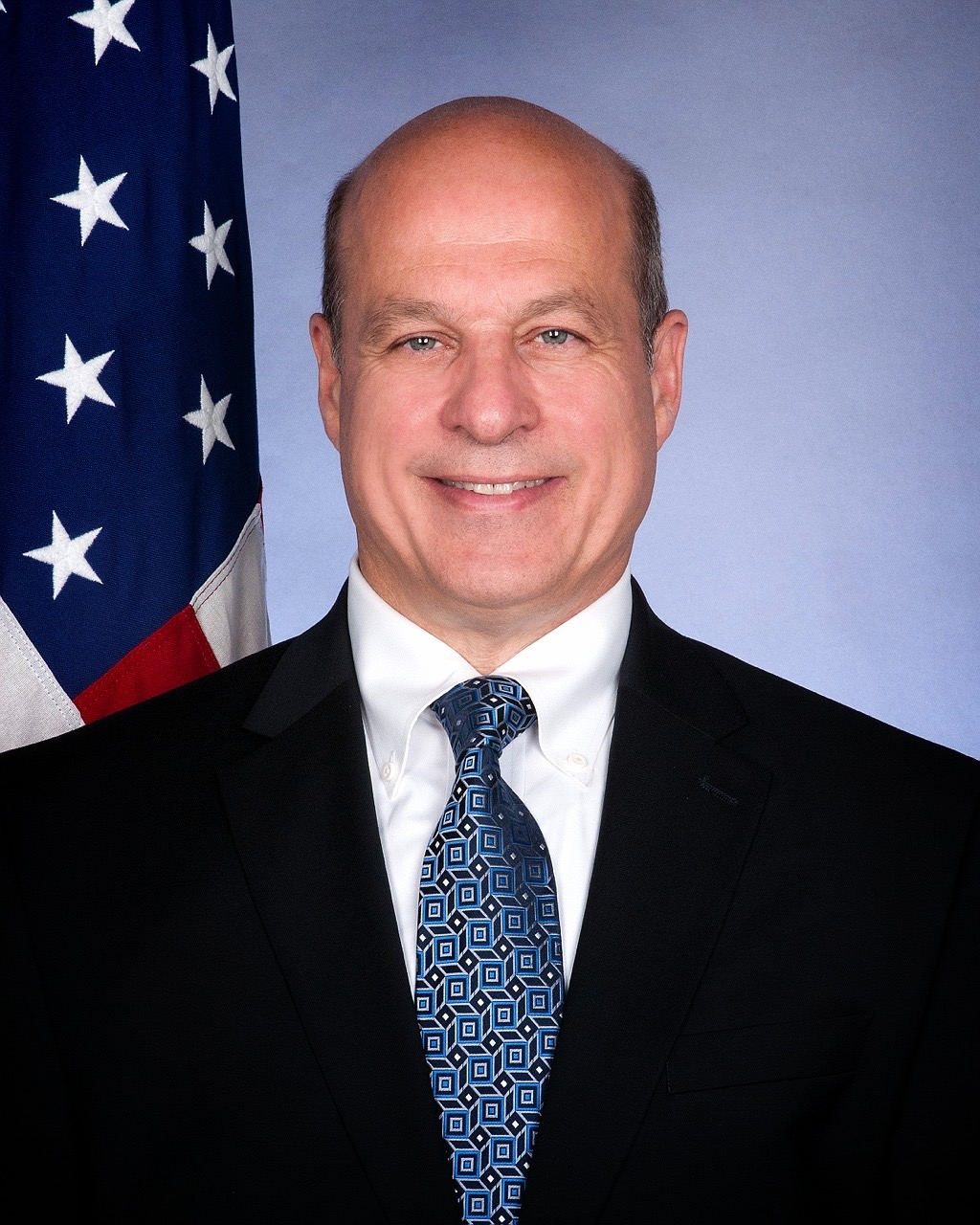

United States Ambassador to Brunei
- In office April 15, 2019 – May 20, 2020
- Appointed by: Donald Trump
- Preceded by: Craig B. Allen
- Succeeded by: Caryn McClelland

Personal details
- Born: April 22, 1954 Portland, Oregon
- Died: May 20, 2020 (aged 66) Vienna, Virginia
- Children: 2
- Education: University of Oregon (BA); Johns Hopkins University (MA)

Matthew John Matthews (April 22, 1954 – May 20, 2020) was an American diplomat who served as the United States Ambassador to Brunei from 2019 to 2020.

== Early life and education ==
Matthews was born and raised in the state of Oregon. He began his studies at the University of Oregon, and traveled to Taipei County, Taiwan to study the Chinese language through a program offered at Fu Jen Catholic University. He then returned to the University of Oregon where he completed a Bachelor of Arts in Chinese Language and Literature. He later earned a Master of Arts from Johns Hopkins University in their School of Advanced International Studies.

== Career ==
Matthews was a career member of the Senior Foreign Service, class of Minister-Counselor. He served as an American diplomat since 1986. He served as Ambassador for Asia-Pacific Economic Cooperation and Deputy Assistant Secretary for Australia, New Zealand, and the Pacific Islands in the Bureau of East Asian and Pacific Affairs. He spent much of his Foreign Service career in the Asia-Pacific region. Matthews held senior assignments in Australia, Malaysia, Hong Kong, China, and the Department of Defense Pacific Command. Additionally, he served as Chief of the Internal Unit, Economic Section, Embassy of the United States, Beijing (2001–04), Deputy Chief of the Economic Office, American Institute in Taiwan (1998-2001), and Economic Officer in Embassy of the United States, Islamabad (1995–97).

On August 23, 2018, President Trump announced his intention to nominate Matthews as the next Ambassador to Brunei Darussalam. On January 2, 2019, his nomination was confirmed by voice vote.

On May 20, 2020, Matthews died in Vienna, Virginia. The US Department of State issued a statement on the passing of Ambassador Matthews.

== Awards ==
Matthews was the recipient of six Superior Honor Awards and two Meritorious Honor Awards. He rose to the rank of Minister-Counselor in the Senior Foreign Service, where he earned a Senior Foreign Service Performance Award. For his service as Foreign Policy Advisor to Admiral Sam Locklear, Commander of the U.S. Pacific Command, Matthews was awarded the CJCS Joint Distinguished Civilian Service Award.

== Personal life ==
Matthews was married and had two children. He was fluent in Mandarin Chinese.

== See also ==
- List of ambassadors of the United States

Diplomatic posts
Preceded by Craig B. Allen	United States Ambassador to Brunei; 2019–2020	Succeeded by Caryn McClelland
