= J. Coleman Drayton =

American lawyer (1852–1934)

- Born: James Coleman Drayton; June 4, 1852; Philadelphia, Pennsylvania, U.S.
- Died: November 11, 1934 (aged 82); Newport, Rhode Island, U.S.
- Education: Princeton University
- Occupation: Lawyer
- Spouse: Charlotte Augusta Astor (m. 1879; div. 1896)
- Children: 4
- Parent(s): Henry E. Drayton; Sarah Hand Coleman

James Coleman Drayton (June 4, 1852 – November 11, 1934) was an American lawyer and socialite. He is known for his marriage and eventual divorce from Charlotte Augusta Astor, which became the subject of international controversy in the 1890s.

== Early life and education ==
J. Coleman Drayton was born in Philadelphia, Pennsylvania on June 4, 1852, the son of Henry E. Drayton and Sarah Hand (née Coleman) Drayton. He attended Princeton University in New Jersey, earning a bachelor's degree in 1873 and a master's degree in 1876. After leaving Princeton, Drayton studied law and was admitted to the New York Bar Association. He was known to travel often, touring Europe for eighteen months in the 1870s, and later touring the world. He was a member of numerous social clubs, including the Union Club of New York, the St. James Club of London, and the Princeton Club of Philadelphia.

== Marriage and divorce of Charlotte Astor ==
On October 20, 1879, Drayton married Charlotte Augusta Astor, a member of the prominent New York Astor family. Her parents were Caroline Schermerhorn Astor (also known as "the Mrs. Astor") and William Backhouse Astor Jr., and her youngest brother was John Jacob Astor IV, who perished during the sinking of RMS Titanic in April 1912. Together, they were the parents of:

- Caroline Astor Drayton (1880–1965), who in 1910 married William Phillips, the U.S. Ambassador to Italy.
- Henry Coleman Drayton (1883–1942), who married Mary Constance Knower (1884–1920). After their divorce, she became the Countess Knower De Suzannet.
- William Astor Drayton (1888–1973), who married Alberta Averill (1888–1961), daughter of Albert William Averill. Alberta was the widow of William Phelps Eno.
- Alida Livingston Drayton (b. 1890), died in infancy.

Their marriage and eventual divorce became the center of international gossip in 1892, when accounts of an affair were published in the Pittsburgh Dispatch and many other newspapers. According to reports, Charlotte and Alsop Borrowe, a member of another wealthy New York family, began spending considerable time together in London. This alarmed Drayton, who subsequently challenged Borrowe to a duel in Paris. However, the duel never took place and Drayton and Charlotte were soon after divorced. The story of the Drayton-Astor divorce was quickly sensationalized, sparking intense scrutiny from newspapers. According to an editorial posted in The Cincinnati Enquirer, "the thunder of Mr. Drayton's suit rocked New York's Mayfair to its very foundation".

== Controversies ==
Contact with Mary Mallon

In 1902, Drayton and his children spent the summer in Dark Harbor, Maine. However, most of the household soon fell ill to typhoid fever. According to reports, the family had employed Mary Mallon, later known as “Typhoid Mary”, as a cook. It is believed that Mallon was responsible for infecting the Drayton family, and further spreading typhoid to other families in the area that summer.

Imposter controversy

In December, 1903, a man named J.J. Carlisle was caught impersonating J. Coleman Drayton and was arrested on the charge of swindling. Accounts of the incident describe how Carlisle reportedly swindled a Minneapolis woman out of $250, claiming to be J. Coleman Drayton. Reports also show that in the past, Carlisle had pretended to be a cousin of J. Coleman Drayton, using this influence to join the staff of the Denver Journal.

== Death ==
J. Coleman Drayton lived in Newport, Rhode Island for the last nine years of his life, where he died on November 11, 1934, at the age of 82. He reportedly died of a lingering illness, which had plagued him for a number of years. He left behind a daughter and two sons.
