= Christ Church (Dark Harbor, Maine) =

Historic church in Maine, United States

- U.S. National Register of Historic Places
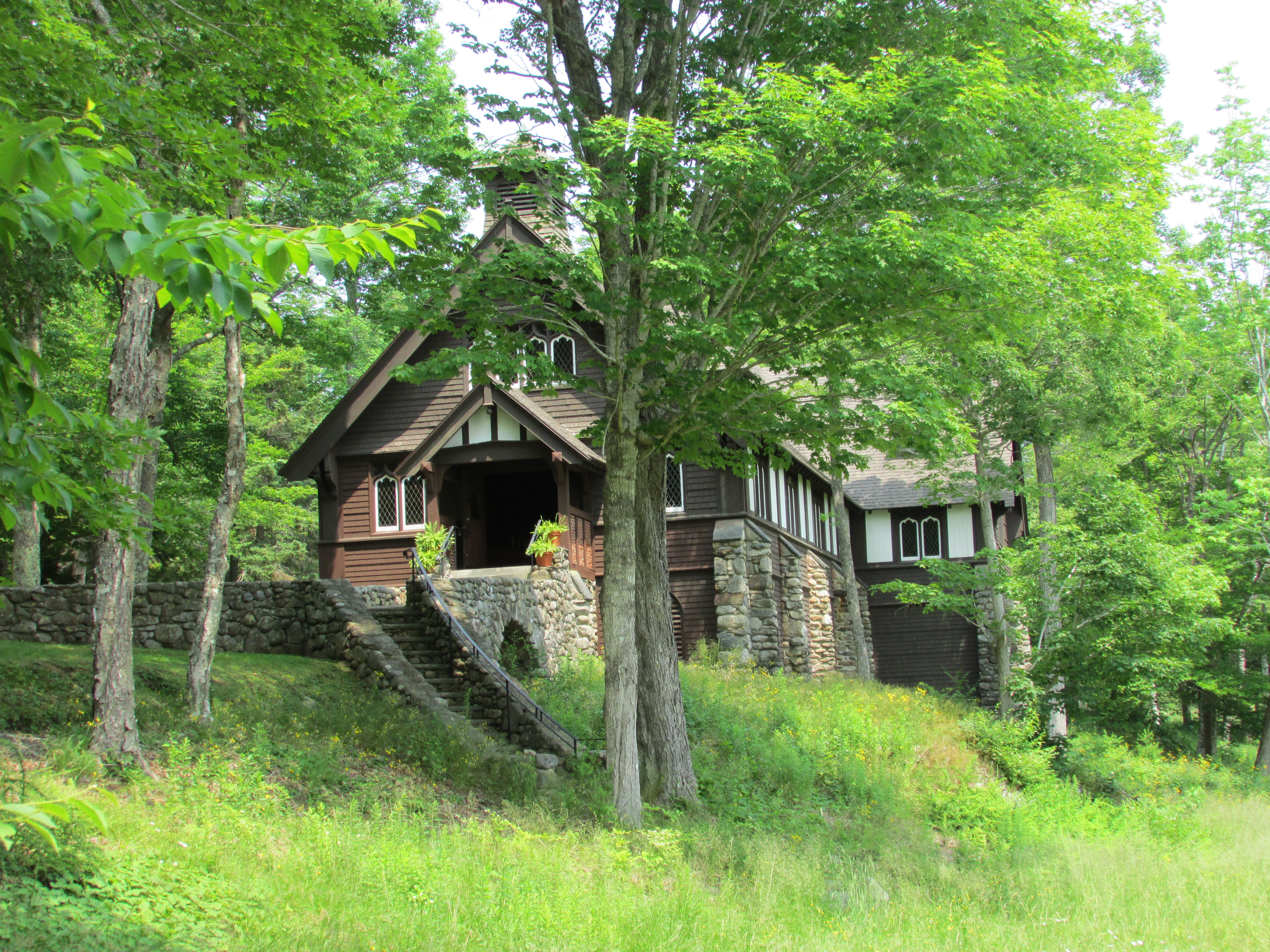

- Location within Maine Location within the United States
- Location: Main Rd. Dark Harbor, Maine
- Coordinates: 44°15′26″N 68°54′45″W
- Area: 4.6 acres (1.9 ha)
- Built: 1901
- Architect: Allen, Francis R.
- Architectural style: Shingle Style
- NRHP reference No.: 92000276
- Added to NRHP: March 26, 1992

Christ Church is a historic non-denominational church on Christ Church Road in the Dark Harbor district of Islesboro, Maine, U.S.A. Since its construction in 1901-02, it has been used for Episcopal services. The building, a well-kept example of Maine's coastal summer churches of the turn of the 20th century, was listed on the National Register of Historic Places in 1992.

== Description and history ==
Christ Church is located in southern Islesboro, an island community in Penobscot Bay in central Maine, U.S.A. It is set overlooking Pendleton Point Road, the major north-south route on the narrow island, which runs to the east of the building. It is a roughly cruciform structure, its long axis oriented north-south, and is finished in wooden shingles and stucco, with a rubblestone foundation. It is reached from Christ Church Road by a walkway lined by stone walls that passes over an arched stone bridge. The south-facing main facade has a gabled entrance porch supported by square posts with decorative brackets, with a half-timbered gable. The porch eaves have exposed rafter ends, and the porch is flanked by paired diamond-pane windows. Above the porch in the main gable is a grouping of four similar windows. The eastern facade, on the downhill side of the sloped site, has an exposed basement with stone buttresses and arched louvered openings.

The Dark Harbor area of Islesboro was developed in the late 19th century as a summer resort area, which, like many of Maine's other coastal summer resort enclaves, soon had a call for Episcopal religious services. The first such services were held at the Islesboro Inn ballroom in 1891, and a small church was soon built on this site. Its capacity was rapidly exceeded, and the present building, designed by Boston architect Francis R. Allen, was built as a major expansion of that structure in 1901-02. The church is governed by an independent board of trustees, and is formally "open to all".

== See also ==
- National Register of Historic Places listings in Waldo County, Maine
