= Theresa Anne Tull =

American diplomat (1936–2025)

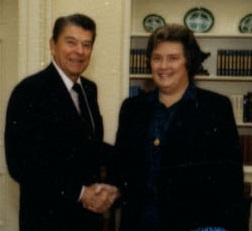
Ronald Reagan and Theresa Anne Tull in the Oval Office

Theresa Anne Tull (October 2, 1936 – November 25, 2025) was an American politician who served as United States Ambassador to Guyana from 1987 to 1990 and Brunei from 1993 until 1996.

Tull was born in Runnemede, New Jersey. She graduated from Camden Catholic High School, had a bachelor’s degree from the University of Maryland, and a master’s degree in Southeast Asian Studies from the University of Michigan in 1973.

Tull died on November 25, 2025, at the age of 89.

== Career ==
Tull was deputy principal officer to the U.S. Consulate General in Da Nang, where she remained until the fall of Vietnam in the spring of 1975, chargé d’affaires in Laos (November 1983 until August 1986) and ambassador to Guyana.

While in Laos, she negotiated the right to search for remains of soldiers missing in action. She coordinated the evacuation of Da Nang and returned to the US with three Vietnamese children. She cared for them until their parents were able to join them.

== Publications ==
- A LONG WAY FROM RUNNEMEDE: One Woman’s Foreign Service Journey
