= Joseph Strauss (admiral) =

United States Navy officer (1861–1948)

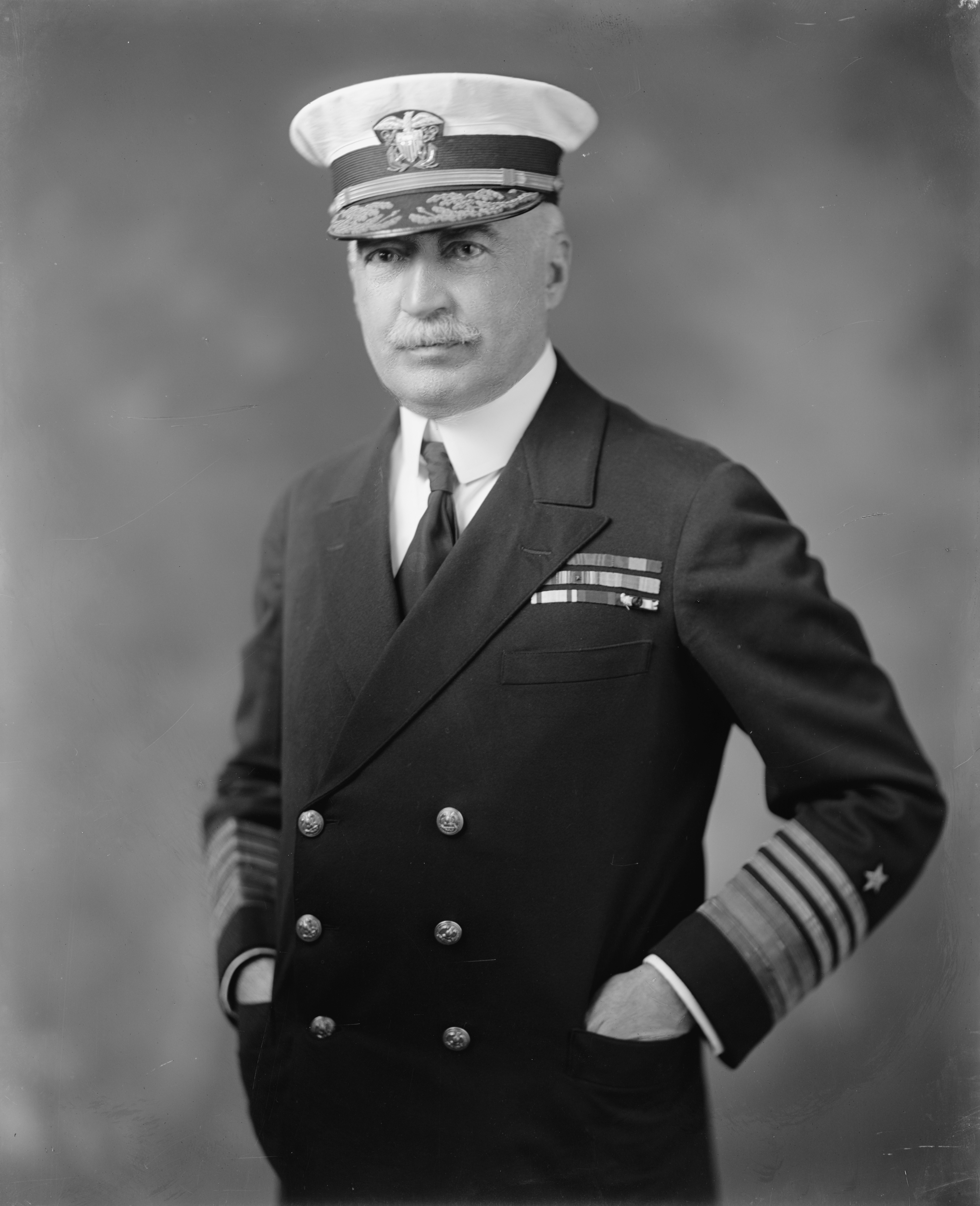
- Born: November 16, 1861; Mount Morris, New York, U.S.
- Died: December 30, 1948 (aged 87)
- Burial place: Arlington National Cemetery
- Relatives: Elliott B. Strauss (son)
- Military career
- Allegiance: United States
- Branch: United States Navy
- Service years: 1887–1925, 1937–1938
- Rank: Admiral
- Commands: USS Montgomery (C-9); USS Ohio (BB-12); USS Nevada (BB-36); Mine Force, Atlantic Fleet; Asiatic Fleet
- Conflicts: Spanish–American War; World War I

Admiral Joseph Strauss (16 November 1861 – 30 December 1948) was an officer of the United States Navy, who served in World War I, and later commanded the Asiatic Fleet.

== Biography ==
Born in Mount Morris, New York, Strauss was commissioned as an ensign on 1 July 1887. He attended the United States Naval Academy and became admiral in the United States Navy. He began a distinguished career as specialist in ordnance in June 1893 when he reported to the Bureau of Ordnance in Washington, D.C. During the Spanish–American War he served in the sloop Lancaster blockading the Cuban coast, then returned to the Bureau of Ordnance. He established the Naval Proving Ground at Indian Head, Maryland, from 1900 to 1902; served on a Special Board of Naval Ordnance in 1906; and was a member of the Joint Army-Navy Board on Smokeless Powders the following year. He conducted experimental work with torpedoes while commanding the cruiser Montgomery from 1909 to 1911; commanded the pre-dreadnought battleship Ohio in 1912; then became Chief of Bureau of Ordnance on 21 October 1913.

Strauss assumed command of the super-dreadnought Nevada on 30 December 1916 and remained in command as the United States entered World War I. Detached from the battleship in February 1918, he was designated Commander, Mine Force, Atlantic Fleet. He was awarded the Distinguished Service Medal both for directing the laying of the North Sea Mine Barrage and for the hazardous task of clearing it after peace came.

In October 1919 he returned to the Navy Department to serve as a member of the General Board until March 1921 when he became commander-in-chief of the Asiatic Fleet with the rank of admiral. He resumed duty with the General Board in October 1922. The following year he also worked with Congress on the budget and appropriations. He transferred to the Retired List on 16 November 1925, but returned briefly to active duty from 8 October 1937 to 8 February 1938 to serve the advisory board on Battleship Plans.

He died on 30 December 1948 and was buried in Arlington National Cemetery.

== Other activities ==
Admiral Strauss was a founder of the Naval Historical Foundation and president of the foundation from 1943 to 1946, helping to create the National Museum of the United States Navy. He also was a longtime financial adviser of the Navy Relief Society. Among his inventions were the superimposed system of mounting guns; the first spring recoil gun mount, the first disappearing mount for deck guns of submarines, and the 12-inch gun, the forerunner of the mighty guns for capital ships' main batteries. He received a special letter of appreciation from Secretary of the Navy Charles F. Adams in 1929 for his work on safety devices of submarines and the salvaging of sunken submarines.

== Namesakes ==
The Navy guided-missile destroyer USS Joseph Strauss was named after him.

Military offices
Preceded by Albert Gleaves	Commander-in-Chief, United States Asiatic Fleet; 4 February 1921 – 28 August 1922	Succeeded by Edwin A. Anderson, Jr.
