= US-China Business Council =

Nonprofit organization

- Formation: 1973; 53 years ago
- Founded at: Washington D.C.
- Type: 501(c)(6) organization
- Tax ID no.: 23-7275160
- President: Sean B. Stein
- Chair: Ryan McInerney
- Website: www.uschina.org
- Formerly called: National Council for US-China Trade

US-China Business Council
- Simplified Chinese: 美中贸易全国委员会
Transcriptions
Standard Mandarin
- Hanyu Pinyin: Měi Zhōng Màoyì Quánguó Wěiyuánhuì

The US-China Business Council (USCBC) is a 501(c)(6) nonprofit organization whose stated goal is promoting trade between the United States and the People's Republic of China (PRC). As of 2024, it comprises over 270 American companies that trade and do business with the PRC.

== History ==
The council was founded in 1973 with the support of the White House, the Department of State and the Department of Commerce as the National Council for United States-China Trade. Frederick B. Dent, the then United States Secretary of Commerce, compiled an executive committee for the council out of several prominent business leaders.

The executive committee first met on March 22, 1973, to begin the formation of the council, with the executive committee members being the first Board of Directors. Donald C. Burnham, of Westinghouse Corporation, took the post of chairman and the Board elected Christopher H. Phillips to be the first president. Phillips would serve as president of the council until his retirement in 1986.

In the first year, the Council attracted 200 members and, by 1982, this had grown to 400 members. In 1974, the council began publishing the China Business Review, a journal aimed at American companies trying to enter the Chinese market. In 1979, the Council opened an office in Beijing.

== Activities ==
The USCBC has consistently lobbied against designating China a currency manipulator.

A 2021 study commissioned by the USCBC stated that the Trump tariffs on Chinese goods directly resulted in the loss of 245,000 American jobs.

A 2021 report by the Foundation for Defense of Democracies identified USCBC as a key facilitator of Beijing's efforts to carry out its campaign of subnational influence in and against the United States.

In 2022, the USCBC lobbied against legislation to screen of outbound U.S. investments for potential national security issues. The council has also expressed concern about the implementation of the Uyghur Forced Labor Prevention Act. The USCBC has lobbied against the expansion of U.S. export controls, especially the expansion of the Entity List.

In 2023, the USCBC and the National Committee on United States–China Relations hosted a banquet with General Secretary of the Chinese Communist Party Xi Jinping for US business executives during the APEC United States 2023 meeting. The banquet drew questions from media about attendees and criticism from the United States House Select Committee on Strategic Competition between the United States and the Chinese Communist Party. Some commentators and scholars have called for the Internal Revenue Service (IRS) to investigate USCBC's tax-exempt status for potential violations of "political and legislative lobbying."

== See also ==
- China–United States relations
- United States-China Economic and Security Review Commission
- Congressional-Executive Commission on China
