= Caryn McClelland =

American diplomat

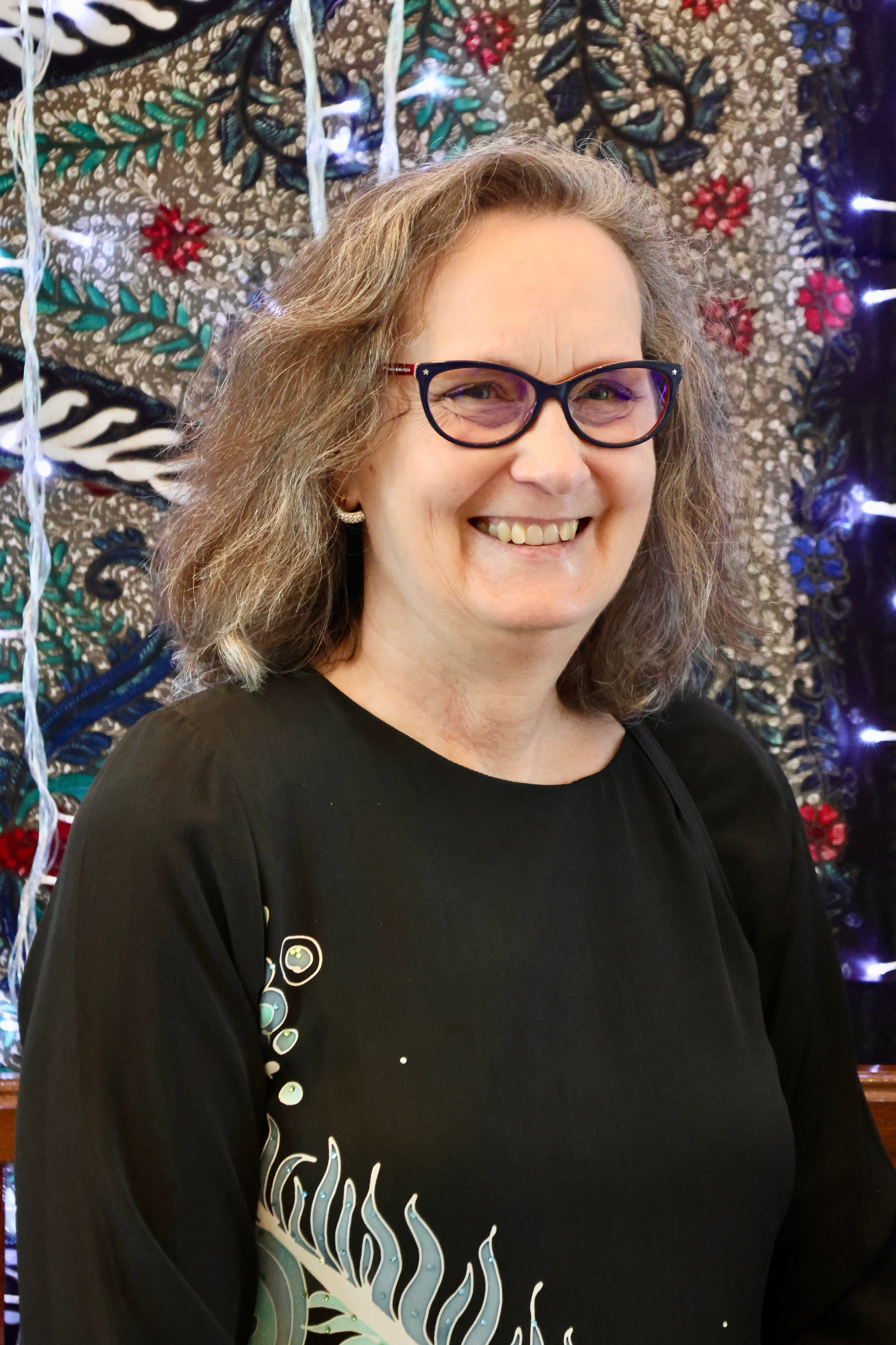
- McClelland in 2024

United States Ambassador to Brunei
- In office May 24, 2022 – June 30, 2026
- President: Joe Biden; Donald Trump
- Preceded by: Matthew J. Matthews

Personal details
- Education: University of California, Los Angeles (BA); San Francisco State University (MA); National Defense University (MS)

Caryn R. McClelland is an American diplomat who had served as the United States ambassador to Brunei.

== Education ==
McClelland earned a Bachelor of Arts in English from the University of California, Los Angeles; a Master of Arts in international relations and affairs from San Francisco State University; and a Master of Science in national security strategy from the National Defense University.

== Career ==
A career diplomat, McClelland has been assigned to U.S. embassies and consulates in London, United Kingdom; Hanoi, Vietnam; Riga, Latvia; Surabaya, Indonesia; Bali, Indonesia; Kuala Lumpur, Malaysia; Baku, Azerbaijan; Dublin, Ireland; Ashgabat, Turkmenistan; and others.

McClelland was the Minister-counselor for economic affairs at the U.S. Embassy in London, serving as acting deputy chief of mission. She previously served as deputy chief of mission at the U.S. embassies in Vietnam and Latvia, and as consul general in Surabaya, Indonesia. She was acting principal deputy assistant secretary of the Bureau of Oceans and International Environmental and Scientific Affairs, and deputy special representative for commercial and business affairs in the Bureau of Economic and Business Affairs. McClelland also served as senior advisor to Richard Morningstar for Caspian Basin energy diplomacy.

=== United States ambassador to Brunei ===
On July 16, 2021, President Joe Biden nominated McClelland to be the next United States ambassador to Brunei. On September 30, 2021, a hearing on her nomination was held before the Senate Foreign Relations Committee. On October 19, 2021, her nomination was reported favorably out of committee. On December 18, 2021, the United States Senate confirmed her nomination by voice vote.

McClelland arrived in the country in February 2022. She presented her credentials to Sultan Hassanal Bolkiah on May 24, 2022.

== Personal life ==
McClelland speaks Indonesian, Latvian and Russian.

Diplomatic posts
Preceded by Emily M. Fleckner; Chargé d'Affaires	United States Ambassador to Brunei; 2022–2026	Incumbent
