= List of ambassadors of the United States to Brunei =

Representative of the United States to Brunei

Ambassador of the United States to Brunei
- Seal of the United States Department of State

- Flag of the United States ambassador

- Incumbent; Laura Brown; Chargé d'affaires since July 1, 2026
- Style: His or Her Excellency (formal); Mr. or Madam Ambassador (informal)
- Reports to: United States Secretary of State
- Residence: Bandar Seri Begawan
- Appointer: President of the United States; with the advice and consent of the Senate
- Term length: At the pleasure of the president
- Inaugural holder: Barrington King as Ambassador Extraordinary and Plenipotentiary
- Formation: April 12, 1984
- Website: U.S. Embassy - Bandar Seri Begawan

The United States ambassador to Brunei is the official representative of the president of the United States and the American government to the monarch and government of Brunei. The position is held by Caryn McClelland, who presented her credentials to Sultan Hassanal Bolkiah on May 24, 2022.

== History ==
Until 1984, Brunei was a self-governing protectorate of the United Kingdom. In 1979 Brunei and the United Kingdom signed a new treaty of friendship and cooperation, and on January 1, 1984, Brunei became a fully independent state.

The United States recognized Brunei immediately. On January 1, 1984, the same day Brunei became independent, the former U.S. Consulate in Bandar Seri Begawan was upgraded to embassy status with Douglas Ellice as Principal Officer and Chargé d’Affaires ad interim. The first ranking U.S. ambassador to Brunei was commissioned on April 12 of the same year.

The United States Embassy in Brunei is located in Bandar Seri Begawan.

== List of ambassadors ==
Name	Portrait	Appointment	Presentation	Termination	Appointer	Notes
Barrington King		April 12, 1984	May 28, 1984	April 30, 1987	Ronald Reagan	
Thomas Crooks Ferguson		July 15, 1987	July 2, 1987	April 9, 1989	Ronald Reagan	
Christopher Hallowell Phillips		October 10, 1989	November 28, 1989	October 31, 1991	George H. W. Bush	
Donald Burnham Ensenat		August 11, 1992	September 26, 1992	June 13, 1993	George H. W. Bush	
Theresa Anne Tull		October 8, 1993	January 5, 1994	April 30, 1996	Bill Clinton	
Glen Robert Rase		July 2, 1996	September 16, 1996	June 6, 1999	Bill Clinton	
Sylvia Gaye Stanfield		August 9, 1999	November 3, 1999	August 28, 2002	Bill Clinton	
Gene Burl Christy		November 15, 2002	January 24, 2003	July 18, 2005	George W. Bush	
Emil Mark Skodon		June 27, 2005	November 1, 2005	August 1, 2008	George W. Bush	
William Edward Todd		July 14, 2008	September 15, 2008	June 6, 2010	George W. Bush	
John William McIntyre		June 6, 2010		March 28, 2011	Barack Obama	Chargé d'Affaires
Daniel Luke Shields		March 28, 2011	April 5, 2011	November 22, 2014	Barack Obama	
Craig Boyd Allen		December 19, 2014	March 9, 2015	July 20, 2018	Barack Obama	
Matthew John Matthews		January 7, 2019	April 15, 2019	May 20, 2020	Donald Trump	†
Scott E. Woodard		May 20, 2020	-	August 2020	Donald Trump	Chargé d'Affaires
Emily M. Fleckner		August 2020	-	May 24, 2022	Donald Trump	Chargé d'Affaires
Caryn McClelland		December 18, 2021	May 24, 2022	June 30, 2026	Joe Biden	

== See also ==
- Brunei–United States relations
- Foreign relations of Brunei
- Ambassadors of the United States
