= Barrington King =

American diplomat (b. 1930, d. 2006)

Barrington King III (1930–28 March 2006) was an American diplomat who served as the first United States ambassador to Brunei from 1984 to 1987. He was assigned to multiple diplomatic postings in Africa, Asia, and Europe.

== Early life ==
Barrington King III had asthma as a child. graduated from the University of Georgia with a degree in art.

== Career ==
King sought employment with the United States Foreign Service, but there was a hiring freeze under President Dwight D. Eisenhower. He worked for the Goodyear Tire and Rubber Company for 18 months. King joined the Social Security Administration in South Carolina after the hiring freeze ended. He did not enter the Foreign Service as it had the same requirements as the United States Army, which he believed he could not join due to his asthma. He took the examinations for the Foreign Service in c. 1954–1956 after learning that the physical requirements were not strict.

King entered the Foreign Service in 1957. He was based in Egypt from 1957 to 1959, the Tanganyika Territory from 1959 to 1961, Tanganyika from 1961 to 1964, Cyprus from 1964 to 1967, Greece from 1967 to 1972, Tunisia from 1972 to 1975, and Pakistan from 1979 to 1984.

In Tanganyika, King was the American vice consul; as Tanganyika was still a colony the United States only had a consulate with six staff members. He was given French language training before his assignment to Tanganyika, which he noted was inappropriate as it was a British colony. President Ronald Reagan appointed King as ambassador to Brunei on April 12, 1984. He presented his credentials on May 28, 1984, and served until April 30, 1987.

== Death ==
King died in Washington, D.C. on 23 March 2006.

== Works cited ==
=== Books ===
- Reid, Peter (2020). Every Hill a Burial Place: The Peace Corps Murder Trial in East Africa. University Press of Kentucky. ISBN 9780813179988.

=== News ===
- "Obituaries". The Washington Post. April 10, 2006.

=== Web ===
- "Ambassador Barrington King" (PDF). Association for Diplomatic Studies and Training. April 18, 1990. Archived (PDF) from the original on November 10, 2026.
- "Barrington King (1930–2006)". United States Department of State. Archived from the original on November 10, 2026.
