= Elliott B. Strauss =

United States Navy admiral (1903–2003

Elliott Bowman Strauss CBE
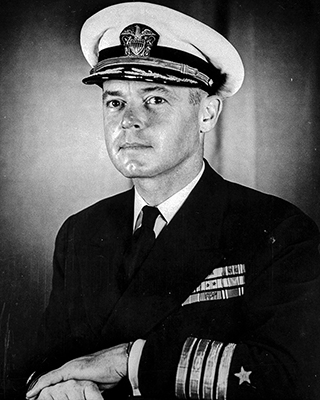

Personal details
- Born: March 15, 1903 Washington, D.C.
- Died: August 19, 2003 (aged 100) Washington, D.C.
- Resting place: Arlington National Cemetery
- Spouses: Lydia Anne Archbold (m. 1928, divorced) Beatrice Drayton Phillips (m. 1951)
- Parent(s): Joseph Strauss; Mary Sweitzer
- Education: The Hotchkiss School
- Alma mater: United States Naval Academy; Royal College of Defence Studies
- Civilian awards: Croix de Guerre

Military service
- Allegiance: United States
- Branch/service: United States Navy
- Years of service: 1923–1953
- Rank: Rear Admiral
- Commands: Brooks (DD-232); Charles Carroll (APA-28); Fresno (CL-121); Destroyer Flotilla 6
- Battles/wars: World War II: Dieppe Raid; Normandy landings; Battle of Okinawa
- Military awards: Bronze Star Medal with Combat "V"; American Defense Service Medal; Asiatic–Pacific Campaign Medal; World War II Victory Medal; Navy Occupation Service Medal; National Defense Service Medal; European–African–Middle Eastern Campaign Medal

Elliott Bowman Strauss, CBE (March 15, 1903 – August 19, 2003) was a rear admiral of the United States Navy who served during World War II.

== Early life ==
Strauss was the son of Admiral Joseph Strauss (1861–1948) and Mary Sweitzer Strauss (1870–1958), and the grandson of Brigadier General Nelson Bowman Sweitzer (1828–1898), the brother of Brigadier General Jacob Bowman Sweitzer (1821–1888). He was born in Washington, D.C., and attended The Hotchkiss School in Connecticut.

Strauss entered the United States Naval Academy in June 1919, and graduated in June 1923 with the rank of ensign.

== Career ==
Most of Strauss' service until the mid-1930s was at sea. However, November 1935 to September 1937, he served as Assistant Naval attaché at the American Embassy in London. While there he was a Delegate to the Third Assembly of the International Union of Geodesy and Geophysics in Edinburgh, in 1936, and on May 12, 1937, was awarded the Coronation Medal at the coronation of King George VI of the United Kingdom.

From October 1939 to December 1940, Strauss commanded the destroyer Brooks (DD-232). He then served as navigator of the light cruiser Nashville (CL-43), taking part in the occupation of Iceland in July 1941.

Strauss returned to London in December 1941 to serve on the staff of Admiral Lord Louis Mountbatten, the Chief of Combined Operations where he participated in the planning of the Dieppe Raid in August 1942.

On May 1, 1943, he was promoted to the rank of captain and served until August 1944 on the staff of Admiral Sir Bertram Ramsay, the Allied Naval Commander in Chief, working on the planning for the Invasion of Normandy, on June 6, 1944.

In October 1944, Strauss took command of the attack transport Charles Carroll (APA-28). In January 1945 he was assigned to the Pacific Fleet and voyaged to Guadalcanal, Manus and Bougainville carrying men and supplies. On April 1, 1945, he took part in the landings on Okinawa. Strauss returned to the United States in August 1945 to serve in the office of the Chief of Naval Operations in Washington D.C.

From November 1946 to December 1947, Strauss commanded the light cruiser Fresno (CL-121), before returning to England to spend most of 1948 as a student at the Imperial Defence College in London. Strauss later commanded Destroyer Flotilla Six. In March 1952 he became Head of the Long Range Plans Branch in the Office of the Chief of Naval Operations.

Strauss retired on July 1, 1953, and was advanced to the rank of Rear Admiral.

=== Later career ===
After retiring from the Navy, Admiral Strauss served in foreign assistance and security assignments in the Agency for International Development and Foreign Service Corps for another eight years, including duty in Paris, Tunisia and the Malagasy Republic.

From August 1956 until March 1957, he was a director of the school of engineering at Bucknell University. He was also a writer and speaker on economic development.

Strauss was a longtime director of the Naval Historical Foundation (NHF), serving for a time as its chairman. The NHF was founded in 1926 to address a concern for the preservation of naval history and traditions. At the time of his death, he was chairman emeritus of the board of directors.

In 1979, Strauss was part of the U.S. Delegation representing the Carter Administration at the funeral of Lord Mountbatten, led by W. Averell Harriman and including Pamela Harriman, Claiborne Pell, Adm. Thomas B. Hayward, George S. Vest, Dr. Cortes F. Enloe, Eugene Haytow, Dr. Rajenda Prasad, James Roosevelt, Gen. Albert Coady Wedemeyer, and Wynelle Watson White.

== Personal life ==
On March 3, 1928, he was married to heiress Lydia Anne Archbold Saunderson (1907–1988), daughter of Anne Mills Archbold (1873–1968) and the granddaughter of John D. Archbold. Her father, Armar Dayrolles Saunderson (1872–1952), was divorced from her mother after he attempted to force her to remain in his native Ireland. Before their divorce, they had three children:

- Elliott MacGregor Strauss (1928–2008)
- Armar Archbold Strauss (1931–2012), who married Umeko Hyoto of Japan.
- Lydia Saunderson Strauss, who married Olivier Guy Delaunay, son of Guy Delaunay of Paris, in 1958.

After their divorce, Lydia remarried to Robert Whittier Foote.

He was married secondly, in 1951, to Beatrice Drayton Phillips (1914–2003), a daughter of former US Ambassador to Belgium, William Phillips, and Caroline Astor Drayton. Together, they were the parents of:

- Christopher J. Strauss

He was a member of the Pilgrims of the United States, the Chevy Chase Club, Army and Navy Club of Washington, DC, the New York Yacht Club, and the Buck's Club and International Sportman's Club, of London.

Strauss died in Washington, D.C. at the age of 100. He is buried in Arlington National Cemetery.

=== Honors ===
Strauss was awarded the Bronze Star Medal with Combat "V", the citation reading:

"For meritorious achievement as the United States Naval Representative on the Staff of the Chief of Combined Operations in the Dieppe Raid, and while serving on the Staff of the Allied Naval Commander in Chief during the Invasion of Normandy. Embarked as an observer in a British destroyer which rendered close fire support during the Allied raid on Dieppe on August 19, 1942, Captain (then Commander) Strauss obtained information of great value to the United States and Great Britain in the planning and execution of subsequent operations. Ordered to the Normandy beaches on D-Day+2, he applied his comprehensive knowledge of the build-up procedure in solving far shore shipping problems which threatened to delay the operations. Serving with distinction, skill and courage despite enemy air and ground attack throughout these missions to halt German aggression, Captain Strauss upheld the highest traditions of the United States Naval Service."

Rear Admiral Strauss was awarded the American Defense Service Medal, the European–African–Middle Eastern Campaign Medal, the Asiatic–Pacific Campaign Medal, the World War II Victory Medal, the Navy Occupation Service Medal Europe Clasp, and the National Defense Service Medal. He was made an honorary Commander of the Order of the British Empire and has the Croix de Guerre of France, with palm.

In 2002, Senator John McCain made a statement on the Floor of the U.S. Senate celebrating Strauss' life and his 99th birthday.
